This is a list of characters from the DreamWorks Animation franchise of Madagascar films and the TV shows.

Concept and creation

Tom McGrath explained in an interview that the intention of Madagascar was not to take a political stance on whether "zoos are bad and the wild is better, or that the wild is bad," but to show "the most extreme 'fish out of water' story that (they) could do". McGrath stated "the basic irony to the story is that, you think animals do belong in the wild, but if they're so accustomed to civility, they wouldn't know where food even came from," and the animals were meant to "love the zoo and to love where they are because they've got"   "right off Fifth Avenue".

McGrath also described, during the research of Madagascar, they "found these crazy, weird animals that were already cartoons in their own right."

Primary

Alex

Alex (born Alakay) is a male African lion. He is best friends with Marty the Zebra (Chris Rock). He is used to the life of comfort in the zoo but learns to adapt to the wild. He's smart, quick thinking and fast on his feet. He is a dancer by nature, often impressing others with his aerobatic feats. He does tend to be a little self-absorbed, often not seeing the problems of others above his own.

Alex enjoys his life at the zoo and has plenty of friends and is surprised when hearing Marty's wish to leave and live in the wild (or run free in Connecticut as stated in the movie). As a cub, Alex was born on an African wildlife reserve, and was named Alakay. He has brown and yellow fur, white whiskers, a black nose, a large, fluffy mane, and a long tufted tail. He was the only son of the alpha lion, Zuba (Bernie Mac), and was constantly given lessons on hunting, though he displayed no interest in the activity. During one of the sessions, Alex was captured by poachers, but the crate he was contained in fell into a river and eventually floated to New York. He is found by humans who renamed him Alex and took him to the Central Park Zoo. In Madagascar, after Marty, Alex's best friend, leaves in an effort to take a train to the wild, Alex, Gloria the hippopotamus (Jada Pinkett Smith), and Melman the giraffe (David Schwimmer) pursue him and are shot with tranquilizer darts by humans. The animal-rights activists pressure the zoo into releasing them back into the wild, but on the ship to the preserve, Alex and his friends fall into the ocean. They wash ashore on Madagascar, and, while Marty is excited to be free, Alex wishes to go home. He grows very hungry after days of being unable to eat, not realizing that steak is animal flesh. Hunger drives Alex into a crazed state, and after almost killing Marty in hunger, in a moment of lucidity, he goes into self-imposed exile, barricading himself in fossa territory. Marty pursues him, unwilling to leave his friend, but is attacked by the fossa, the native predators of Madagascar. Alex works to defend Marty and is later given sushi by the penguins to satiate his hunger.

In Madagascar: Escape 2 Africa, Alex encounters his parents, Zuba and Florrie (Sherri Shepherd), who are overjoyed to see their son and he becomes co-alpha lion alongside his father.

Zuba assumes Alex is strong after hearing he is the "King" of New York and arranges a rite of passage into the pride. Makunga (Alec Baldwin), Zuba's rival, persuades Alex to challenge Teetsi during the Alex's rite of passage. Teetsi was revealed to be a bulky, strong lion and Alex is quickly defeated by him. To keep from banishing Alex, Zuba transfers his control to Makunga, and in turn, he, Florrie, and Alex are banished. Zuba soon grows unaccepting of Alex after realizing he is not a fierce warrior. The next day, the watering hole is shown to be dried up and Alex leaves with Marty to find out the cause. They leave the safety of the reserve, prompting Zuba to follow Alex and bring him back. Alex discovers that the stranded New Yorkers had created a dam, and through the use of dancing, he is recognized by the attacking New Yorkers. With the help of others, the dam is destroyed and they return to the preserve. His father learns to respect his habits, and they remain in Africa instead of flying home with the penguins. In The Madagascar Penguins in a Christmas Caper, a stuffed animal Alex is seen briefly and its head is quickly dismembered by Nana's toy poodle, Mr. Chew. Alex has small cameos with his friends celebrating Christmas and singing an alternate version of "Jingle Bells".

The fact that Alex loses the challenge to Teetsi and is spanked by Nana in Madagascar gives him the impression he is a horrible fighter, but this is not true, because (in the Nana case), she only gets Alex by surprise, but was more visible when in Madagascar 2, he has a short fight against Nana. Alex is shown to have a superhuman level of physical strength, seeing that he broke the zoo's public telephone, and lifts Melman, Marty and Gloria with relative ease.

Alex made another appearance in "The Return of the Revenge of Dr. Blowhole." Wally Wingert reprises his role from the first video game. In the show, he appeared as a hallucination "spirit guide" to help Skipper, whose memories had been stolen by the evil dolphin known as Dr. Blowhole. At first, Skipper thought he was very talkative and annoying, but soon he accepted his guidance, especially when he had to face Blowhole when he got back to New York City. A running gag in the episode is that Skipper's friends are confused and convinced he's crazy when they see him talk to Alex, since only Skipper can see him. After Dr. Blowhole was defeated, Alex's spirit guide form disappeared.

In Madagascar 3: Europe's Most Wanted, it opens on Alex's birthday and after a present from his friends of a mud New York he is determined to get the penguins from Monte Carlo. Alex creates four phases and after a fight with his friends they are exposed and are pursued by Captain Chantel DuBois.

After cutting DuBois' snare, they fly back to New York until they crash in a train yard. Alex is determined to get back home and tries to fix the plane but fails. Then he persuades Gia (Jessica Chastain), a jaguar to let them on the train, with whom he is smitten upon first sight. After being let on the train Alex, Marty, Melman and Gloria realized that this was a ticket home.

After a performance in Rome, he gives a pep talk and has the circus spiced up to get the circus promoter for a tour in America. Stefano told Alex why Vitaly (Bryan Cranston) the Siberian tiger was grouchy. Alex teaches Gia trapeze, and they begin to fall deeply in love. The London performance was better and they go to America. DuBois came to "take home" Alex but gets shot out of a cannon. Alex tells them why they had to join the circus.

Alex convinces his friends and Julien that they were wrong and they decide to go back until DuBois comes. Awakening, Alex realizes they are back in the zoo with iron cage links between them. Luckily the circus came and rescued him. But DuBois is still determined to get Alex's head and is taking Stefano. But Alex saves the day (with Gia's help) by saving Stefano (Martin Short), a sea lion, and defeating DuBois.

Marty

Marty is a male plains zebra who used to live at the Central Park Zoo, and is a good friend of Alex the lion. He once had an iPod before Alex accidentally broke it. Marty likes seaweed on a stick.

Marty is a hopeless optimist; he usually sees the brighter side of many things, taking every situation in stride. He strives to be unique, which proves difficult when he meets his own kind in Africa, who look and act almost exactly the same. Marty is best friends with Alex and the two are rarely at odds. His carefree lifestyle tends to get on the nerves of his friends, but mostly serves to impress them; he is the one who helps hold the group together when things seem to get down.

Marty lived a life of comfort in the zoo. After his tenth birthday had come and gone, meaning that his life was already half over, Marty decided that never having seen the wild, he must travel to the wild, for at least a short time.

In the movie, Alex says he's black with white stripes, as he has 30 black, and only 29 white, but this was partly because Alex had to give an explanation as to why he was licking Marty, as he thought he was the steak in his dream.

The film begins on Marty's 10th birthday (middle-aged for a zebra). His friends try to give him a great birthday, but somehow, Marty wants more. He escapes the Central Park Zoo, where he had lived for the past ten years, and makes a dash for the wild. His friends, Alex, Melman the giraffe, and Gloria the hippopotamus, flag him down, but as they are about to take him back to the zoo, police officers and animal control officers appear in all directions, tranquilize the animals, and send them on a ship to a wildlife preserve in Kenya. The penguins take over the ship and the four friends are washed up on the shores of Madagascar.

Once on the island, Marty had his dream fulfilled. Marty sets up a "bar" on the island, known as "Casa del Wild" (English: Home of the Wild). Alex gets mad at Marty for getting them shipped to the wild, but he later apologizes to Marty and actually begins to enjoy himself on the island. Unfortunately, his enjoyment brings on his killer instincts, causing him to attack the resident lemurs and his friends, including Marty. Alex does not "go savage" for long, and after regaining his senses, he runs away from his friends out of regret. Soon after that, Marty learns the hard way that the wild is not what it seems to be, and how hard it really is for many animals to live there with so many predators and other dangers. Realizing the consequences brought upon by his impulsive actions, such as sacrificing his and the other's lives at the Zoo (the one safe place they called home) and the misfortune he caused his best friend, Marty comes to truly regret his birthday wish. However, after learning of the penguins having hijacked a boat and are offering the zoo animals a trip back home, Marty immediately runs after Alex in hopes to save his friend. Alex is later able to rejoin his friends as they head back to the zoo.

Marty, along with his friends, has only a few small cameos in The Madagascar Penguins in a Christmas Caper. He, Alex, and Gloria are seen at the beginning decorating Melman's neck with Christmas lights. At the end, he, his friends, and almost all the other zoo animals are seen singing their own version of "Jingle Bells".

In Madagascar: Escape 2 Africa, Marty (along with Alex, Melman, Gloria, the lemurs, and the penguins) finds himself stranded in Africa after a failed attempt at flying to New York. There, he joins a herd of zebra that all look and sound exactly like him. While he enjoys this new lifestyle at first, he quickly becomes depressed when it becomes evident he has no individuality in a herd. Marty also becomes upset when Alex is unable to tell him apart from the other zebras. Ultimately, Alex is able to make amends by picking Marty out of the herd (later revealed to be due to the bite mark left on his backside from the previous film, and the fact that he is black with white stripes, while the other zebras are all white with black stripes.) Marty accompanies his friend to unblock a dam set by stranded New Yorkers in the jungle (which causes the watering hole to dry up). When Alex is caught, Marty gets the other animals to help rescue him.

In Madagascar 3: Europe's Most Wanted, Marty joins the circus along with the others. His circus act is cannon along with Stefano the sea lion. In the middle of the film, Marty loves his afro. At the end of the film, it is shown that Marty is dancing in his afro (along with the others) to the tune Afro Circus / I like to Move it.

Melman

Melman Mankiewicz is a male reticulated giraffe. He has a furry coat, green eyes, a snout, a long neck, brown spots, horns, and a tufted tail. He is somewhat of a hypochondriac, having doses of medicine for meals and doctor's appointments frequently. He even complains about having brown spots on his neck (the spots, in real life, are natural).

He is skittish most of the time, but often has moments of profound clarity. His experience being medicated has given him insight regarding how to treat sick or injured animals who might otherwise give up hope and dig a hole, waiting to die in it. His love for Gloria is deep, and is always a gentleman to her; to Marty and Alex, he's just another one of the "awkward" guys.

Melman had a residence at the Central Park Zoo, where he received constant medical treatment for problems that were all psychosomatic. He would undergo MRIs, CAT scans, injections, flu shots, and be put into braces and crutches for no particular purpose at all. In the Central Park Zoo, Melman was used to his cushy life taking pills and undergoing treatments. One night, Marty the Zebra escaped and Melman immediately informed Alex of this.

In a flashback in Madagascar: Escape 2 Africa, there is a hint that he had a crush on Gloria as a child (as he seems uncomfortable when she comments that Alex is cute). When the animals nearly die trying to fly back to New York in a salvaged airplane, he screams he is in love with Gloria; but she is asleep and does not hear him. In Africa, Melman is horrified to learn that once a giraffe becomes sick, it has no way to survive and therefore must simply wait in a hole to die. He takes the position of Witch Doctor to cure sick animals, introducing them to Western medicine and giving them longer and better lives.

While he proves to be a very good witch doctor, he is informed by another giraffe that Melman has a brown spot on his shoulder, one which the previous Witch Doctor seemed to have gotten and "was gone" two days later. Thinking he only has two days to live, Melman initially waits in a hole, but then takes King Julien's advice and goes to declare his love to Gloria. He finds her on a date and simply tells her date what a wonderful girl Gloria is and to treat her right. When the watering hole dries up and King Julien decides to sacrifice an animal for the water gods, Melman offers himself. He is saved at the last moment, when Gloria tells him that she loves him back, and the two become a couple; it becomes apparent the "brown spot" was not fatal (the previous Witch Doctor is found alive and well, the brown spot in fact being a natural giraffe spot); however, there is not a scene where Melman is told of this. It is assumed that he figured it out when his "time" came and went and he was fine. He was last seen dancing off into the sunset with Gloria, Alex and Marty.

In Madagascar 3: Europe's Most Wanted, Melman and Gloria are still together. They and the other animals go to Monte Carlo to find the penguins. Once inside the hotel, Melman, Alex and Marty argue over who should be the leader of the group. They are crushed by Gloria's weight and they fall into the casino. Whilst escaping the hotel with the other animals, they are pursued by DuBois. On the way they lose DuBois and manage to reach the Hotel Ambassador. While boarding the plane, Melman is grabbed by the neck when DuBois appears. Alex with a little help from Mort, cuts the rope and saves Melman.

Above the skies of France, the plane's engine fails and it crash lands into a suburban rail yard. Whilst running from the authorities who are closing in on them, Melman gives Alex the idea of boarding the train containing the circus. Upon arrival in Rome, Melman and the group realize how terrible the circus was. En route to London, Melman and the others are discussing how terrible the circus was before Alex tells them about his newfound inspiration.

Melman and Gloria create a dancing tightrope act that is performed in London. When Melman and his friends are pursued by DuBois, the circus discover their true identities.

Gloria 

Gloria is a female hippopotamus who resided in the Central Park Zoo as an attraction, all the while being good friends with Alex, Marty, Melman, and becoming the latter's girlfriend as of Madagascar: Escape 2 Africa. She has gray skin, brown eyes, a snout, short arms and legs, black fingernails, an enormously fat belly, short stubby tail, and a triangular belly button. Gloria comically serves as the height and weight of the gang, both intentionally and in situations she accidentally falls into. She is often serious with what she is talking about and the guys are careful not to get on her nerves.

As a hippopotamus, Gloria is another animal in the Central Park Zoo and was one of the many attractions, drawing crowds that enjoyed seeing her swim about in her water tank. She would also receive the star treatment as one of the zoo's main attractions and attend Marty's birthday party. At this party, Marty announced his wish upon blowing out the candles on his cake: to go to the wild. Gloria, Alex and Melman tried to have Marty come to his senses by telling him life out in the wilds was savage and difficult, whereas life in the zoos was adequate. Marty was unhappy at hearing this, and Gloria told Alex to go to console Marty. Later that night, Marty acted out his wish and headed straight for the Grand Central Terminal station to take a Metro North train and go to Connecticut, where Marty heard wide open spaces were found. Gloria urged both Alex and Melman to come with her to find Marty and bring him back before any people would notice. They were found, regardless, along with Mason and Phil, the two chimps, and a troupe of secretive penguins, all ending up tranquilized with darts.

When they all came to, they found themselves in crates bound for Africa. When the penguins hijack the ship, the crates fall into the ocean and wash up on the island of Madagascar. After some confusion, they start to set up their own society and attract the attention of a lemur colony.

In Madagascar: Escape 2 Africa, Gloria expresses a desire to join in the zoo breeding program, in the hopes of finding a boyfriend. When the animals crash land in Africa, she attracts the attention of a hippo named Moto Moto. Though she thinks he is the ideal boyfriend at first, she realizes that he only loves her for her enormous stomach, whereas Melman loves her for who she is. Realizing that she loves Melman back, she stops him from sacrificing himself into the volcano, even saying "It's crazy to think that I had to go halfway around the world to find the perfect guy was right next door..." and then joins the other animals in rescuing Alex from Nana.

Gloria returns in Madagascar 3: Europe's Most Wanted with Melman, the couple finds their way as they contribute to the circus' success with a spectacular tightrope act.

The Penguins
The Penguins are a group of NYC adélie penguin spies. Skipper is a major character in the first film, but Kowalski, Rico, and Private are supporting characters and don't talk much until The Madagascar Penguins in a Christmas Caper. All four penguins have major roles in the first sequel and supporting roles in the second sequel.

Skipper

Skipper is the leader of the adélie penguins (despite their color-schemes not matching the real species) and is the main character in the TV show. He has dark, sapphire-blue eyes and his head is flatter than those of the other three penguins. Like the rest of the penguins, he has no idea what is expected of the penguin species, other than to "smile and wave." At one point, Private used a bird biology book to tell the other penguins how to act, but since the penguins usually need the chimpanzees Phil and Mason to translate for them, it was unclear how either he or Private were able to read the biology book, which is presumably written in English. His sidekicks, Kowalski, Rico, and Private don't talk much until The Madagascar Penguins in a Christmas Caper.

In the first Madagascar movie, Skipper is the mastermind behind a plot to escape the confines of the zoo and leave for Antarctica. Kowalski, Rico, and Private are his accomplices in this plot. They dig under their enclosure until they reach Marty the zebra, thinking it to be the South Pole. Skipper explains to Marty that they are attempting to escape the zoo because penguins do not belong there in captivity. He then orders his accomplices to continue tunneling. Late that night, Skipper and the other penguins are caught by a SWAT team, as are six other animals found outside the zoo. The penguins are tranquilized and put into a crate to be transferred.

When they awake, Skipper is confused at the lettering on the crate where they are being held and orders Mason to read it; Mason's companion Phil reads it. According to the box, they are all bound for a wildlife preserve in Africa, despite the cold climate penguins need. Skipper orders Rico to pick the lock on the crate where they are held, whereupon the four penguins knock out the crew and take command of the ship, commandeering it to reach Antarctica. Skipper and his mates finally reach Antarctica and are sorely disappointed by the barren, desolate terrain. Skipper has the ship return quickly from the South Pole, where it crashes into the beaches of Madagascar and a much warmer climate. Upon arriving, he and the other three encounter Gloria and Melman, and see that Alex and Marty are gone. Skipper decides to help rescue Marty from the grim fate of being eaten by the native fossa (possibly as gratitude for Marty's silence regarding the escape). It is Skipper who helps to distract the fossa while Marty is recovered, and also helps fight off a number of them.

Skipper notices later on that Alex is still hungry, not having been able to eat steak, and has Rico prepare sushi for Alex. Skipper then relinquishes control of the ship to Alex, as he no longer needs it, and proceeds to sunbathe on the tropical beaches in comfort. Skipper is asked by Private if they should tell Alex and his friends that the ship is out of gas. Skipper declines, telling his troupe to "Just smile and wave, boys. Smile and wave."

In Madagascar: Escape 2 Africa, Skipper and the penguins salvage a crashed airplane to fly back to New York. They fix the plane when it crashes in Africa with the help of "more thumbs" (Mason and Phil). At the end of the movie, he marries a bobblehead doll. In The Penguins of Madagascar, the bobblehead is nowhere to be seen.

In Madagascar 3: Europe's Most Wanted, it is revealed that Skipper, Kowalski, Rico and Private, along with Mason and Phil, have been in Monte Carlo. With Phil dressed as the "King of Versailles," they are able to amass a fortune of jewels, diamonds and gold and plan to buy an aircraft to pick up the "hippies" (Alex, Marty, Gloria, and Melman) in Africa and return to New York. Things change when Alex and the others rush to Monte Casino, believing that the penguins have abandoned them. Skipper later uses the fortune to help the gang become part of a traveling circus.

Skipper is one of the four main characters of The Penguins of Madagascar. In the show, many things are revealed about him and it expands on his character from the movies. In multiple episodes it is shown that Skipper knows karate and is an exceptionally capable fighter. He's also very strong, as seen in "Launchtime." In "Crown Fools," he states that he had taken down an angry walrus with "a wing and a prayer and another wing". However, in "Needle Point", it is revealed that he has a fear of needles, so in later episodes if he's injured he's treated with medical cream or the like. Generally, he is a straight man, displaying a very stereotypical general personality when not in battle: he's been shown waking his men up early in the morning for training, has given them trials on being able to work without him a number of times, and has been shown to being very hard-boiled. He is, though, soft on his men at times, properly rewarding them and even showing fear and worry when he knows they're in danger. He becomes especially upset when he believes one of them to be dead. He often tries to hide this part, as he once told Private that he (Private) is always bait because he "is gullible and expendable," but later becomes upset when Private is eaten.

Although Skipper's plans and theories often serve as jokes, his most unorthodox theories are sometimes proven true; the Blowhole existence is the most extreme example of this. Doctor Blowhole is first mentioned in "Eclipsed", when Skipper brings up his plan to extinguish the sun; this is because the sun was covered by a solar eclipse and, before Mason, Phil, and Kowalski mentioned it, Skipper believed he finally succeeded. Skipper being paranoid often comes up due to his theories, and whether or not he's right depends on the episode. Often, those around him refuse to follow along, mostly Marlene because she believes Skipper overreacts. He often comes up with theories without basis on new arrivals, usually flying piranha or being a spy for Doctor Blowhole. According to him, there are actually 8 continents, since he counts Atlantis (and appears to believe it is off the coast of Brazil). He once tells Maurice that if he had Skipper's security clearance, he would believe it too. Skipper indicates that he believes that some new arrivals to the zoo could be flying piranha. In the episode "Launchtime," when he asks Kowalski to search for a place where nearly no lemurs can be found, he states that he cannot set foot in Denmark; when Private questions him on this, he replies by saying "Well, that's private, Private, between me and the Danes." It is later revealed that the incident in question was caused by Hans the Puffin, revolving around a fish fight and top secret documents that made them both public enemy number one.

Skipper has mentioned that there used to be two more penguins (Manfredi and Johnson, named for two ill-fated characters in the World War II prisoner-of-war saga Stalag 17) in addition to himself and the other three; this is unconfirmed, and these claims have never been adequately explained. When they're brought up, it's usually as a warning or an aside remark, as they died in the past during a mission. In "The Hidden", he mentions that they died during a mission when they were attacked by "flying piranhas" and that they had to "bury what was left of them with a tea spoon". In "A Kipper for Skipper," when Skipper states that "relatively few penguins get left behind", as the others point out that Manfredi, Johnson, and another penguin were. In "Roger Dodger," he tells Rico that he would take him out if he had to and tells him "just ask Manfredi and Johnson." In "An Elephant Never Forgets," he tells them that while he was training Private that Manfredi and Johnson "fell for the exploding elephant foot." They are also mentioned by Private, who claims that they mistook the hind end of a beluga whale for an escape tunnel. In "Maurice at Peace," it is implied that they were accidentally smothered by the others due to a misinterpretation of a message which actually said to smother them with affection. In "Smotherly Love," it is mentioned that they died a very relaxing death in a day spa.

In The Penguins of Madagascar, he uses some Italian words such as "Sempre all'erta" (in "Haunted Habitat"), "Bravissimo" (in "The Hidden"), "Attenzione" (in "Crown Fools"), "Eccellente" (in "Kingdom Come"), "Finito!" (in "Popcorn Panic") and "Perfetto" (in "An Elephant Never Forgets"). His Italian pronunciation is not perfect. In "The Falcon and the Snow Job," Skipper falls for a female Peregrine falcon named Kitka and they date for a while. Skipper breaks up with her after it is revealed that she had swallowed Fred the squirrel, and in subsequent episodes she wasn't heard from or mentioned.

Skipper shares a very strong friendship with Marlene, a female Asian Otter who lives across from the penguins and is a main character in the series. Despite their conflicting differences and clashes of personality, the two still remain very close and are able to keep their bond of friendship strong. Marlene is also considered "privileged" by Skipper, due to the fact that he thinks of her as a smart, which is rather unusual, considering his otherwise generally scornful opinion of mammals. He sometimes allows her to tag along on missions.

As the series The Penguins of Madagascar continues, Skipper starts to realize that Private is following in his footsteps in "Private and the Winky-Factory." Skipper also becomes less sensitive to his enemies Dr. Blowhole and Hans the Puffin. Over the course of the series, he likes and trusts them less and less. In the Dr. Blowhole Special "Blowhole Strikes Back," Hans and Skipper are referred to as "frenemies." At the beginning of the episode, Hans surprises Skipper by meeting him in China and refers to him as such.

Kowalski

Kowalski is second-in-command and the tallest of the penguins, forming plans for the group and usually taking notes for Skipper. When Skipper is absent, he takes charge and his rank is First lieutenant. He has brown eyes and tends to over-analyze situations.

Often formulating plans for the group, Kowalski is a loyal supporter of his leader, Skipper. Kowalski had escaped the zoo with the other penguins but was promptly captured and put into a crate for transfer with his comrades. The crates were all placed on a ship bound for Africa, where all the creatures from the zoo would be kept in a wildlife preserve. While in the crate, Kowalski confessed that he could not read and asked another transferee, a chimpanzee named Phil, to read the words on the crate. As soon as this was done, the four penguins headed to the ship's bridge, knocked out the crew and captain, bound them up, and Kowalski plotted the ship's course to Antarctica.

He is the technician of the group and always has his notepad (and, every now an then, an abacus). While being able to formulate plans and invent things (such as a rocket ship out of a trashcan and fireworks, a futuristic rotary saw blade made of energy and multiple random objects, or an intelligence manipulator from just a cardboard box and a magnet and a vacuum; in Madagascar 3: Europe's Most Wanted, an invention of his called a "nucular" reactor  is used.), he is shown to have a bit of difficulty deducing simpler machines. At the end of "Needle Point", it is revealed that he has a fear of zoological oral checks. He seems to also spout nearly or completely nonsensical words, such as, "The moo cow may have a chocolate marshmallow", or "I'll be a bicycle cream cone", whenever either hit incredibly hard or shocked severely. He screamed "Galileo Galilei" when he got his injection during "Needle Point". He also loves candy.

In the series he is shown to be intelligent but it is not as apparent in the films, which reveal that he does not know how to read. He does most of his calculations on an abacus, although he was briefly in possession of a calculator that was destroyed. He is in love with a dolphin called Doris and recorded a poem for her on DVD which highlighted her apparent non-interest in him in the "Hot Ice" episode.

It has been noted that his inventions have a habit of horribly backfiring regardless of his best intentions or their successes. Some of his most significant blunders include: a time machine (or 'Chronotron') that triggered a temporal rift that nearly destroyed reality despite remaining functional enough for Kowalski to time travel, resulting in three of him at once (noticeably, his first arrival saw him wanting to stop the ray and his second one saw him wanting it to keep working); a youth ray that turned Skipper into a chick; a mind-switching machine (which backfired in its first use because he forgot to take the warm-blooded/cold-blooded conflict into account when switching Rico with Roger); a time-stopping device called the "Chronocurbulator" that left time seemingly permanently frozen when it broke down; a helmet that granted the user the power of telekinesis; an invisibility ray (or 'Transparent Matter-Maker', called 'Transmatterer' for short due to copyright issues) that turned itself invisible before being set to randomly fire; a mind-reading machine that quickly burnt out due to lack of processing power; a cloning machine that relied on the Higgs Boson particle for power; nanites that could reprogram other machines (these were programmed to not harm a penguin, but this backfired when they locked the penguins in their habitat to 'protect' them); and the artificially engineered life-form 'Jiggles', who consumed the zoo's fruit and nearly destroyed the zoo when it grew to monstrous size. As a result of his inventions, he comes off as unhinged, especially when he becomes overly defensive about what he does. Outright called a mad scientist by Skipper, Kowalski often creates things in order to "show them" and has, on few occasions, hidden his devices. In "I Know Why The Caged Bird Goes Insane", he becomes increasingly derailed as the episode goes on after being temporarily confined to a wheelchair, mostly because the nursery he was being held in was right next door to the Science Expo, and he makes a few attempts to break out.

Kowalski can play a banjo and sing as seen in the episode "Concrete Jungle Survival".

Rico

Rico, third-in-command of the penguins, does not really talk very much, usually communicating in babbles and mumbles. He is similar in physical features to the other penguins in the movies, but he has a tuft of feathers shaped like a mohawk and a scar of unknown origin on his left cheek in the television series, which makes him easier to distinguish, particularly from Skipper. Rico is the greediest and fattest of the penguins - he will eat almost anything, and thinks constantly of food. Skipper describes him as "clearly a world-class psychopath". Rico appears to be not merely particularly psychotic, but to some degree mentally deficient. In "Friend in a Box" Kowalski points a mind-reading device at him which, despite seeming to function perfectly for the other three penguins, picks up only the word 'Fish' being thought by Rico. According to Skipper, it was a mystery how Rico passed the psych test. On the other hand, in "Cat's Cradle" Skipper tells Rico to demonstrate shutting off all unnecessary brain functions to conserve oxygen, and Rico seems to 'deactivate' by deflating his entire body.

In the first and second film, what little speech Rico used suggested that his native language is Japanese, and his sushi-preparation skills added to this idea. However, in the TV series, he communicated with excitable garbled grunts, but could still manage short sentences in English, and his language further improved by the second season.
 
He's the team's weapons expert and his main function is to regurgitate any necessary tools that Skipper may need for a mission. His stomach operates as a hammer space, containing items as large or larger than himself, or that weigh much more than common sense would allow, with no ill effect on himself. He can swallow and regurgitate almost anything from paperclips and explosives, all the way to a running chainsaw and ground-to-air missile. As the show went on, characters could actually reach inside him and pull things out. His stomach even contains a spiral staircase and elevator, and he can swallow other characters and regurgitate them safely, as he has swallowed both Mort and Kowalski. He's very fond of explosives, and his answer to problems would always be "Kaboom!", if Skipper did not keep him in line.
 
Rico has little tolerance for "mushy" stuff, and often becomes nauseous when Private gets overly emotional and "lovey-dovey" about something. On the other hand he seems to be the second most emotional penguin next to Private and is deeply in love with a plastic doll called Ms. Perky. Another characteristic of Rico is that he might be incredibly superstitious, as, after receiving a rather dismal sounding fortune in a fortune cookie, Rico was a victim of pranks by King Julien who was trying to prove it was right. Even after revealing that Julien was behind the accidents, Rico still needed to have him "take away the curse." He is also insanely skilled with knives and bladed objects, able to make sashimi or carve a Christmas tree from ice in a matter of seconds and destroy bowling pin dummies with a chainsaw while blindfolded.

Rico appears to have an outstanding opera voice when excited (as seen in episodes "Go Fish", "Herring Impaired", "High Moltage", "Hair Apparent", etc.).
 
In the episode "Herring Impaired", Rico shows that he can be responsible when his friends need help, and because the other penguins had "Pisces Dementia", Rico had to keep watch over his friends to make sure they don't have another fish for 24 hours. During the episode, Maurice asked that "Since when did we get four Ricos?" showing that Rico is actually known for his appetite for fish and insanity among the other animals.

Private

Private is the youngest and shortest of the penguins. He has light blue eyes and speaks with a British accent (though the other penguins think his accent is fake). Private has been known to be a rather curious penguin and is much nicer and down-to-earth than the others. In a way, he's much more childish, enjoying "Lunacorns" (pony dolls based on a show that teaches good morals and friendship) and often suggesting much nicer plans (such as asking for something instead of breaking into a habitat or simply telling the truth to others.) He is often called inexperienced by the others. He has an addiction to Peanut Butter Winkies, first displayed in "Skorka" and further elaborated on in later episodes.

He was overprotective of the egg in the episode "Paternal Egg-Stinct", though given how his team mates were treating it (Skipper put it through a dangerous obstacle course, Kowalski tried shock treatments to increase its intelligence, and Rico was flying it with a hang glider), this was rational. Private is very good at deciphering code, communications and peace treaties, and in some degrees, common sense.

Private has been known to give life lessons (in "Mort Unbound" he tells Mort, "There is a natural order of things" and in "Two Feet High and Rising" he tells Mort that Julien's feet "are just feet; not love"). Private is emotionally sensitive, and is often portrayed as more observant or down to earth than the others (noticing when Skipper's ankle tag had not been taken off, indicating that he did not get a shot or suggesting that Maurice had stumbled back because of being blinded by a camera flash, which Skipper quickly labeled as preposterous though he nevertheless told Kowalski to run a scenario) but also has fighting skills on a par with or only slightly below those of Rico and Skipper (in "The Hidden" he is able to block rapid strikes from Skipper and disarm him with his feet while spinning on his head, all while blindfolded). On the wall of the Penguins' HQ is a stuffed fish with a sign "Private's First Prize"; hiding behind it (as well as a bunch of electronic precautions) is his most prized possession: a butterscotch lollipop. Like Kowalski, he loves candy, but eating too much of it causes him to hallucinate. He has an abnormal fear of badgers and cockroaches, as shown in the "Badger Pride" and "Stop Bugging Me" episodes respectively. When Private is the last available penguin to fix a situation (such as when it's revealed that the penguins had spied on the rest of the zoo occupants or during 'Untouchable'), he is able to rise to the occasion and execute a solution that benefits everyone.

In the episode "Cute-Astrophe", Private ended up developing a "hyper-cute" ability, wherein he achieves a state of over 132% adorability, that will make everyone around him pass out as they cannot cope with how absolutely cute he is. At first, Skipper abused the hyper-cute, using it on everyone around them, so Private swore to never use it again after the misuse of the hyper-cute caused chaos around the zoo and nearly got them sent away. Despite his vow, the hyper-cute made appearances in other episodes. This ability was attempted in one episode when Private was molting, but instead of knocking an observer out with adorability, it frightened and panicked anybody seeing him use the ability.

In the "Concrete Jungle Survival" episode, Private received the rank of Private First Class after successfully passing a test in the city. He had been just a Private beforehand.

In the Christmas special "Merry Madagascar" Private finds himself falling in love with Cupid, one of Santa's reindeer. The relationship is short-lived, as Cupid must return and work with Santa. Private reminded her that they would "Always have Madagascar!" as she flew off.

Private is the only penguin with known relatives, he has an uncle named Nigel (though they may not be related), and in "Operation Penguin," he mentions his father is named Sam Fishy, though Sam Fishy has yet to be shown onscreen. However, in Penguins of Madagascar, he appeared to have been abandoned as an egg, leading to the possibility that he is an orphan.

The Lemurs

King Julien XIII

As great king of the lemurs, Julien ruled over a great colony of lemurs in Madagascar using mostly his charisma and delegating, i.e. telling other animals what they should do since he certainly had very little ability to lead. Nevertheless, he shows more intelligence and calmness compared to the other lemurs (aside from Maurice), which is shown when the very word "Fossa" drives all of them, except himself and Maurice, into a state of panic.

He had parties for his subjects on Madagascar with much frequency, the likes of which were interrupted constantly by the fossa, which trespassed onto the lemur territory, devouring all that they could catch.

In Julien's early life as seen in All Hail King Julien, he was depicted as the nephew of King Julien XII, who banned all noisy things to keep the fossa from attacking. After Julien XII abdicated to evade a prophecy from being eaten by the Fossa, Julien XIII became the new King of the Lemurs and did things that were opposite his uncle's rules. He saves his subjects from the Fossa and got bitten on the rear by the Fossa and he survived. When he learns that his nephew is still alive and is still king, his devious uncle tries to get rid of him and reclaim the throne. When he returned, Julien XII tricks Julien XIII into going into the Fossa territory to find out what they're planning with Maurice joining him. In the end, Julien discovered his uncle's plot, glad that Clover chose him over his uncle, and gives his uncle a second chance, by putting him in the Fossa disguise, that is being cuddled by a Fossa girl, much to his uncle's dismay.

The day Alex and his friends came to Madagascar, King Julien and his subjects were enjoying one of their parties when it was invaded by the fossa. When the fossa were scared off by Alex, Julien and his people were hiding in the trees and saw this scene, thinking Alex and his friends were giants from some faraway land, with Julien coming forward and presenting himself as the king of the lemurs — once he had ascertained they were not dangerous by tempting them with Mort.

When asked where the people were, Julien pointed to a skeleton of a man caught in a parachute hanging from a tree. Later that night, Julien had a meeting of the lemurs and other creatures of the jungle in the plane. Julien insisted that if they could make friends with Alex and his friends, the fossa would be scared away for good. Maurice was skeptical about this plan, but Julien insisted that, being king, his ideas were the best. Julien's plan failed when Alex started attacking the lemurs and his friends. Although Alex then turned back to normal and the foossa were scared away with only the actions of the four main characters and the penguins, Julien took the credits for its success. However, when it went wrong, he did not foist the idea back onto Maurice.

When Alex and his friends were ready to go back to New York, Julien gave them his crown; he had already made himself a bigger, better one using a leaf-tailed gecko named Stevie.

In Madagascar: Escape 2 Africa, Julien, along with Maurice and Mort, accompany Alex, Marty, Gloria and Melman to New York on the plane built by the penguins while leaving Stevie in charge until the day he returns. He is in the first class, ordering constant refreshments, and amusing himself with old plane crash films. As the plane crashes down to Africa after running out of fuel and momentum, Julien takes utter pleasure in the feeling of weightlessness caused by the high-speed descent. By being in first class, he escapes the crash with a parachute but loses his crown.

Upon arriving in Africa, Julien at first believes they are in New York and makes himself a new crown. He manages to gain some power while in Africa, although very few characters actually pay attention to him, getting to ride a flock of flamingos with Maurice, then moving on to riding ostriches and finally an elephant. Later, when the reserve's watering hole dries up, Julien suggests to the animals that they make a sacrifice to "his good friends, the water gods" at the volcano to replenish the water. To convince the masses, King Julien enacts his casual conversation with the Water Gods. Later, Julien persuades Melman to volunteer for the sacrifice, who believed he was going to die soon anyway. But when Melman realized he was going to live, he gave up on being a sacrifice, leaving Julien disappointed at his plan's failure. Mort arrives soon after, followed by a persistent shark that had been attempting to eat him. This shark then falls into the volcano, thus completing the sacrifice, and as Julien comes out of the volcano, he sees the water coming back to the reserve (due, in fact, to a dam constructed by Nana being destroyed by Alex and Zuba), and is convinced of his plan's success. From this King Julien concludes that the Water Gods like seafood more.

Julien appears in The Penguins of Madagascar regularly, often noisily and unintentionally annoying Skipper and pretty much everyone. He is the self-proclaimed "King of the Zoo" no doubt due to his former king status on Madagascar. Only Mort and Maurice truly believe and respect him as their king, the rest just show up to his "proclamation of royal decrees." Julien is proven to be a worthy ally in most episodes, since it is him who sometimes saves the day for the penguins (like in "Dr. Blowhole's Revenge"). Julien hates having anyone touch his feet, such as passing a royal decree that anyone who touches his feet would be banished from his kingdom (the zoo). When the sewer rats went to the zoo and tricked the Penguins out of their home, Julien decided to play for the Penguins in a game of Hockey to try and win their home back. They were losing until one of the rats touched his feet, after that he lost it and beat all of them on his own.

In the episode "Crown Fools", Julien panics when he loses his crown and obsessively longs for it until it is revealed that he had a spare crown all along (prompting Marlene, who was trying to make him new crowns all day, to chase him with a crowbar). Despite his desire for everyone to listen and do what he wants, he dislikes and ignores Mort, his most loyal follower, who treats him like a god. Mort responds to everything Julien tells him to do as "I like..." followed by whatever Julien said. In the episode The walk talk he mentioned that he had a dream that he was "The last mammal on Earth". Mort was just happy to be in the dream despite that he was "road kill" in it.

A recurring gag in The Penguins of Madagascar series is that Julien believes in supernatural beings, which sometimes annoys the other animals. In the episode Misfortune Cookie, Rico gets a fortune cookie that reads "You will soon meet a fowl end." The penguins deny that fortune cookies have any power, despite receiving three accurate fortunes, and dismiss it as superstition. Julien exclaims "these stitions are super," and tries to get the penguins to believe in the supernatural. King Julien actively plots to make a "foul end" fortune come true - by his own doing. It is also known that his believing in spirits can be used against him, seeing that Mason and Phil trick Julien into believing that the "sky spirits" are angry with the Julien self-centrism, thing that change Julien's personality. But when Skipper notices that kind Julien is more annoying than the narcissist Julien, Skipper makes him come back to his original self.

It is also shown that Julien gains a super-lemur level of strength if he gets mad. Visible when in "Miracle on Ice", Julien spanked and humiliated the Rat King, after one of his henchmen touched Julien's feet; In Happy King Julien Day, Maurice claims that Julien violently used a cane to spank everyone who forgot his self-proclaimed holiday.

In Madagascar 3: Europe's Most Wanted, he has a bigger role and falls in love with Sonya the Bear. Also, he saved the day by managing to get back to the circus.

Baron Cohen has stated he based the voice of King Julien from his Sri Lankan attorney.

Maurice

Maurice, birth name Bricky, is an overweight aye-aye, despite being an aye-aye, he lacks the distinctive middle finger.

Maurice is King Julien's advisor - although Julien seldom listens to him - and often shows skepticism of his ruler's mad plans. He has a long squirrel-like bushy tail. He lived in a tribe of other lemurs and witnessed newcomers to their home: a quartet of zoo animals. Maurice was suspicious of Alex, a lion, thinking him to be potentially dangerous. Maurice expressed this concern during a meeting of the lemurs and jungle animals, but was ignored by Julien. The next day, Maurice took part in the festival honoring the newcomers. During the festival, his suspicions about Alex become confirmed as Alex starts to give into his natural predatory instincts, and shortly after explained the trouble with having a lion around. He knew that Alex would need to eat meat, and felt that Alex should leave and go to the carnivore side of the island. He later stopped Alex from eating Marty by dropping a coconut on his head, earning praise from his king.

Shortly after, Maurice witnessed Gloria, Melman, and Marty working with a group of penguins to fight off the fossa that were attacking the lemur tribe. Maurice had to admit that King Julien's plan had worked and that fossa would no longer be of any worry. Maurice saw the newcomers out when they decided to leave and was obligated to wave King Julien's arm for him, as the king was tired of waving it.

In the sequel Madagascar: Escape 2 Africa, Maurice does not have a prominent role, basically agreeing to whatever King Julien says. In the series, he often acts like a strict big brother to Mort and knows him so well that in "The Penguin Stays in the Picture" he is shocked to find that Mort only ate half of his popsicle, prompting Skipper to go find him because he suspected Mort went missing, which was correct.

He is shown to have many hidden talents in several episodes such as painting and speaking chameleon in "The Hidden" and using a yo-yo in "Friend-in-a-Box." In "The Lost Treasure of the Golden Squirrel," his desire to control an army of Julien man-servants is revealed. Despite being overweight, he was still able to hold his own when he got into a physical fight with Kowalski and Rico in "The Lost Treasure of the Golden Squirrel." He has shown attraction to Darla the Baboon.

Maurice returns with a much smaller role in Madagascar 3: Europe's Most Wanted, where he and the other two lemurs join the zoosters in catching up with the penguins and chimps. After joining the circus, the trio of lemurs fall into a crate holding Sonya the bear. Julien falls in love with Sonya, weirding-out Maurice and Mort. The two don't show up again until the end of the movie where they gun Dubois with a tranquilizer dart.

Mort

Mort is a mouse lemur who is one of the biggest fans of King Julien ever. Julien finds Mort incredibly annoying, and does not hesitate in proclaiming so. Despite this, Mort does not show any lasting unhappiness, and his expression changes within the same scene. A running gag is that Mort commonly pukes. Mort has an obsession with Julien's feet ever since he used them to kick some fossa. Mort also has very good money skills as shown in the episode "Gimme Gimme Gimme: The Game" where he cleverly becomes the richest lemur in Madagascar (all the other lemurs became broke, including Julien, after having all their money and possessions taken by Mort, who gives it all back after Julien, defeated, says that he had won, showing that he believed that it was all a game). In the episode "Oh Captain, Muy Captain (Part 2)", it is revealed that Mort was a fearsome pirate named Dread Pirate Mort at some point. In every episode, Mort was able to develop different personalities such as Smart Mort and his Evil Grammy which resulted in his personality disorder. During the events of "Exiled", it is revealed that Mort is an immortal transdimensional being and all of his alternate personalities are dimensional counterparts who he defeated and absorbed their life essence. By the end of the season, he marries the mountain lemur Zora but they later break up in Season 5. On September 11, 2001, Mort and his crew flew two planes into the World Trade Center, also known as the twin towers, in what is now known as the tragedy called 9/11.

In The Penguins of Madagascar episode "Sting Operation", when the penguins turn into idiots, they had the same obsession for feet just like him, which Julien despises. In his anger, Julien once banished Mort from their habitat at the zoo, forcing Mort to seek a "cure" from the Penguins.

Mort makes his first appearance in Madagascar, where he doesn't have that big of a role. He lives among the other native lemurs under Julien. Julien uses him as a test to see if Alex and the others eat lemurs, and Mort quickly decides that he likes them, as he is later shown to have a tendency to like everything. Later, Julien notes that if Alex does not like fish and still hungers for steak, Mort is "Plan B". Mort is last seen in the film with the other lemurs wishing the zoo animals farewell, and Julien uses him as a makeshift foot-rest.

In Madagascar: Escape 2 Africa, Mort plays a much larger role. He attempts to follow Julien and Maurice on the penguins' plane, but Julien goes to extremes to keep him out of the plane, declaring that Mort had "scissors and hand cream" (he did in fact, have a pair of scissors, however he lacked any hand cream on the journey.) causing the security guards to brutality assault him. Mort succeeds in attaching himself to the outside of the plane, where he is seen by Alex (parodying a scene of The Twilight Zones episode Nightmare at 20.000 feet), before falling into the ocean shortly before it crashed. After reaching a shore at Africa, Mort is pursued by a persistent shark, which follows him onto the African preserve. Mort (still followed by the shark) finds Julien at a volcano where Melman had just decided that he would not sacrifice himself to return the preserve's water. The shark accidentally falls into the volcano just as Alex and Zuba destroy the dam blocking the river, thus leading Julien to think that his plan for sacrifice was correct.

Mort makes appearances through The Penguins of Madagascar, along with Julien and Maurice. At one point, stuffed "Mort" dolls became very popular, and out of jealousy Julien throws them into the skunk habitat. Mort is accidentally shipped back to the factory with the dolls, and must be rescued. In the episode, King Julien also reveals that the only reason he allows Mort to stay with them is so he can express his dislike for Mort in front of him, and keep himself entertained. Mort is also shown to be unhappy with his past self after growing in size and muscle mass due to an invention from Kowalski. After being turned back into his regular self, Mort expresses that he is happy with who he is. In the television series, whenever an animal or object is falling it almost always lands on Mort. Despite the fact that Mort is often treated poorly by King Julien, the other characters show concern for him as Maurice tries (if with limited success) to save Mort when he may be in danger, and Skipper, who refers to Mort as "sad-eyes", dived in the way of the mutant rat overlord to save Mort. In the episode "Otter Woman", all the boys are attracted to Marlene because her fur turned white. Mort tries the same thing in the end of the episode, without success.

Mort returned in Madagascar 3: Europe's Most Wanted. In this film Mort does a few things including vomiting on Alex's birthday cake, helping Alex defeat Dubois early on in the film, being part of the Afro Circus with the other lemurs, and tranquilizing Dubois with knockout darts. Mort is a valuable character in the Madagascar movies.  

Throughout All Hail King Julien (2014-2017), jokes and dialogue indicate that he has an obsession with King Julien's feet, to the point where he clings onto Julien's feet, has erected a shrine to worship them, and collects foot-themed souvenirs including keychains and toenails.

In All Hail King Julien: Exiled, he remains loyal to Julien even after the kingdom is enslaved and Julien disappears. While enslaved in Exiled, Mort takes comfort in what appears to be a pastel drawing of King Julien's foot, which he keeps above his bed before it is confiscated by guards. As in the 2014 series, the show heavily implies that Mort has a dissociative identity disorder by showing his intense arguments between multiple versions of himself. These include a logical Mort, a wild-eyed, murderous Mort, and a feminine Mort with a southern accent. A spotlight shines on the personality speaking, and once the dissociative episode is over, Mort appears confused and disoriented. Other lemurs appear shocked and fearful when Mort publicly plunges into one of his dissociative episodes, often staring silently at him after he regains his identity.

Mason and Phil

Mason and Phil are two sophisticated common chimpanzees at the Central Park Zoo, who prefer to drink cups of coffee and "read" the newspaper in the morning. Mason speaks with a stereotypical British accent; Phil, by contrast, doesn't speak at all and communicates entirely through American Sign Language, though whether he is actually mute is unknown. While Mason is unable to read, Phil can and is used to decipher writing while Mason translates the ASL. Both escape the zoo after Gloria breaks through its outer wall; Mason mentions Tom Wolfe giving a lecture, and they plan to attend to "throw poo at him." Along with the zoosters, Phil and Mason are captured and sent to a wildlife reserve. However, their crates are not thrown off the boat, and they are not seen until a final scene, in which they are still in crates waving farewell to the Madagascar natives.

In Madagascar: Escape 2 Africa, the chimps call upon others of their kind living in Africa to help rebuild the wrecked plane that was supposed to fly them back to New York. They later go on strike, asking for maternity leaves and breaks (Skipper argues that they are all males); eventually, they blackmail Skipper into agreeing.

In The Penguins of Madagascar, Mason and Phil are supporting characters in the series, and are shown to be annoyed by Julien's partying. They attempt to rid him of his ways by tricking Julien into thinking a solar eclipse was a sign that the "sky spirits" disapproved of his behavior. They also frequently mention throwing poo and are used to read the English language. Phil may be the most temperamental or "potty mouthed" of the two, as after being told there is no checkmate in checkers, he makes several signs which Mason responds with "You groom your mother with those hands?!" Phil and Mason may also sometimes lose things in the translation of what they are made to read. An instance of this is when the zoo occupants were ordered to make a cake for King Julien, and Mason mistakes "booger" for "sugar". This does not mean that Phil is unable to communicate well, even though he is unable to truly speak, he was still able to win over the heart of Lulu, a female chimp visiting from the Hoboken Zoo in New Jersey for a weekend, While Lulu did appear in a later episode where the penguins ended up accidentally finding themselves in the Hoboken Zoo, it is unknown if she keeps in touch with Phil.

McGrath explained that originally their "first scene was just deciphering the code on the shipping label". The crew "got this girl who knew American Sign Language" to give them hand gestures. They wanted gestures to be "really frenetic", and "she signed out, 'Tell the tiny pea-brained birds that the sign reads: Ship to.... Afterward, the crew returned to the scene where Mason notes Tom Wolfe's lecture, and she signed "Can we throw our poo at his stupid white suit?" Mason is named after legendary British actor James Mason, whose urbane, sophisticated vocal styling is mimicked by Vernon.

In Madagascar 3: Europe's Most Wanted Mason and Phil have smaller roles and are mostly seen posing as the King of Versailles.

They make a cameo appearance on a newspaper in Turbo.

Circus Zaragoza Animals
The animals of Circus Zaragoza are trained circus performers that Alex's group had met while on the run from Chantel DuBois. Among the animals of Circus Zaragoza are:

Vitaly

Vitaly is a muscular Siberian tiger with a Russian accent who leads a traveling circus in Madagascar 3: Europe's Most Wanted.

The tough Vitaly once jumped through flaming rings of fire to excite crowds, constantly pushing himself to the limit by jumping through smaller and smaller rings that seemed impossible for his size while lubricating himself with olive oil. But after losing his confidence and more than a few of his hairs on one fateful attempt which involved a flaming ring that would only fit on the smallest finger (due to the olive oil being flammable), he also lost his passion and his act partially. When Alex and his friends plead with the circus to let them escape on their train, Vitaly is the most resistant, only to be overruled by Gia. When the zoo animals purchase the circus, Vitaly remains the most hostile to their changes to the business, even as the rest of the crew becomes inspired.

In London, Vitaly decides to give up and prepares to leave just before the circus' critical performance. Alex confronts Vitaly and reminds the tiger of his love of performing and while suggesting he uses hair conditioner as a safer lubricant before regaining his courage to jump through the tiny flaming hoop. As a result, Vitaly's stunt is performed perfectly to open the successful show. With that, a profoundly heartened Vitaly becomes a fast friend of Alex. Even after the zoo animals are exposed and estranged from the circus, Vitaly is the first to support Gia's proposal to rescue their new friends from the zoo and plays a key role in that operation.

Gia

Gia is a jaguar with an Italian accent who is part of the traveling circus in Madagascar 3: Europe's Most Wanted. She wears a blue woven floral necklace, has gold eyes and has heart-shaped palms. She is Alex's love interest who is always on the lookout to discover something new and gets her chance when she convinces a reluctant Alex to teach her the trapeze – "Circus Americano" style. Her only role in the circus before Alex, Marty, Melman and Gloria came around was doing normal cat tricks (sitting, standing, rolling over) but when Alex teaches her the trapeze, she performs with him and they move closer. Later on, she and the other circus animals save Alex and the gang from Dubois.

Stefano

Stefano is a sea lion with an Italian accent and curly whiskers. He is part of the traveling circus in Madagascar 3: Europe's Most Wanted and is a happy, fun-loving Italian sea lion who always looks on the brighter side of things. A true entertainer at heart, he is up for any challenge to save the circus, even convincing Alex that the show must go on.

Sonya

Sonya is the traveling circus' most ferocious, yet playful Eurasian brown bear who appears in Madagascar 3: Europe's Most Wanted. Her tricycle riding act is only topped by her ridiculous tutu. But her biggest trick of all will be casting a spell on King Julien, who is instantly smitten with her. Strangely, she does not talk in English nor is as anthropomorphic like most of the other characters, but Julien can understand what she is saying when she growls (the way she communicates instead). However, she might have human intelligence.

While they are in Rome, she and Julien travel to Vatican City where they steal the Pope's ring after Julien pretends to kiss it and uses it to buy her a Ducati motorbike after they fall down a set of stairs and destroy her tricycle, which she uses in her performance in London.

The Andalusian Triplets

Esperanza, Esmeralda, and Ernestina (voiced by Paz Vega) are three of the new characters in Madagascar 3: Europe's Most Wanted. They are white Andalusian Mares with Spanish accents who like Marty and are part of the circus. All of their names start with "E" and end with "A". When Alex's group improved the Circus Zaragoza, the Andalusian Triplets bounced on the trampolines during their act while wearing butterfly wings on their outfits.

They were listed as "Horses" in the credits.

The Dancing Dogs

The Dancing Dogs are a group of six performing dogs with British Cockney accents as members of the circus in Madagascar 3: Europe's Most Wanted. They tend to fight and argue with each other and they hate being called cute and cuddly. The Dancing Dogs consist of Frankie (voiced by Nick Fletcher), Freddie (voiced by Vinnie Jones), Jonesy (voiced by Steve Jones), Shakey (voiced by Adam Buxton), Bobby, and Sammy. Only the first three are credited.

Manu and Maya
Manu and Maya are two performing Indian elephants as members of Circus Zaragoza in Madagascar 3: Europe's Most Wanted.

Their names are revealed in the DVD commentary as well as the fact that they are German. According to Tom McGrath, they are very nice and great to work with. They remain silent in the film due to the fact that their possible dialogue was cut from the film.

Secondary
 Ted (voiced by Bill Fagerbakke) is a polar bear who lives in the Central Park Zoo. He first appeared in "The Madagascar Penguins in a Christmas Caper" where he was depressed due to being alone on Christmas. This caused Private to want to give him a present. When Skipper denied his request, Private snuck into the city to find Ted a gift only to be kidnapped by Nana. After getting Private back, the other penguins decided to invite Ted to their Christmas party where the polar bear had invited the rest of the Zoo as the animals present sing their rendition of "Jingle Bells." He made a brief background cameo in the first movie. In the series, he mainly appears as a background zoo animal. He did play a small role in the episode "P.E.L.T." when Skipper had to provoke and evade a polar predator.
 Zuba (voiced by Bernie Mac in the film, Dan White in the video game) is a lion who is Alex's father and the alpha lion of the pride in Madagascar: Escape 2 Africa. He was first seen as the Alpha Lion of a pride in the reserve where Alex was born. At first, he thinks that Alex has returned to take over, but his wife notices that they both have the same birthmark and realizes that Alex is their son. Zuba is a proud father, but he is somewhat confused as to why his son is interested in dancing. After many events in the movie including Alex failing the rite of passage and shaming his family, Zuba finally accepts Alex. The film was dedicated to Bernie Mac's memory as it was one of his final roles before he passed away.
 Florrie (voiced by Sherri Shepherd) is Alex's mother, Zuba's wife, and the alpha lioness of the pride in Madagascar: Escape 2 Africa. Florrie, unlike Zuba, accepts Alex for what he is. She is not disturbed at all by the fact that Alex prefers to dance instead of fight. Due to this, she acts as the voice of reason and tries to encourage Zuba that it is better that Alex came back to them, dancer or not, as a king. Florrie is never addressed by her name in the film and in the movie's end credits, she is credited as "Mom". It's in the novelization that her name is revealed.
 Moto Moto (voiced by will.i.am in the film, Greg Eagles in the video game) is a handsome and muscular hippopotamus with an attractive deep voice, who is very attracted to 'big and chunky' female hippopotamuses. In Madagascar: Escape 2 Africa, he courts and romantically pursues Gloria. However, Gloria, his love interest, realizes that Moto Moto only loves her because of her "chunkiness". She does not realize this at first, but later, Melman the Giraffe confesses his love and tells Moto Moto to treat her right. This causes Gloria to break up with Moto Moto, and his last appearance is when he's looking for water during a severe drought only to find a bunch of jewels. The scene where the female hippos tell Gloria that Moto Moto likes her has become an internet meme during 2019.
 An unnamed female Okapi (voiced by Taraji P. Henson) appears in Madly Madagascar, whom Marty finds himself in love with. She is not interested until he uses a love potion on himself, causing her and all the other female animals to begin pampering him. She and the other animals lose interest in him after he jumps into a lake to hide from them (due to becoming overwhelmed by the pampering), causing the potion to wash off.
 North Wind is an Arctic elite undercover interspecies task force that is dedicated to helping animals that can't help themselves. They worked with the Penguins in order to thwart the plans of the villain Dave (aka Dr. Octavius Brine). Among the members of North Wind are:
 Classified (voiced by Benedict Cumberbatch) is a courageous yet slightly arrogant British wolf and the team leader of North Wind. He is at loggerheads with Skipper. Skipper calls him Classified, who states his name isn't really "Classified". His name is classified (as in "top secret") because he is the leader of the team. He is the North Wind's counterpart of Skipper.
 Short Fuse (voiced by Ken Jeong) is a Bulgarian harp seal. He is the North Wind's explosive and demolitions expert. He is the North Wind's counterpart of Rico.
 Eva (voiced by Annet Mahendru) is a Russian snowy owl and North Wind's intelligence analyst. Kowalski has a crush on her. Coincidentally, she is the North Wind's counterpart of Kowalski.
 Corporal (voiced by Peter Stormare) is a Norwegian polar bear and the muscle of the North Wind team. He seems to like penguins and he freaks out when other penguins are taken. He is the North Wind's counterpart of Private (loosely, as he's also able to fight well, but shows affection at a great level, like Private.)

Antagonists
 Nana (voiced by Elisa Gabrielli in the films, Marion Ross in the second video game) is an elderly lady with a Yiddish accent and the archenemy of Alex the Lion. Nana's personality changes over her appearances. Initially, she appears as a very aggressive old lady with incredible martial arts skills. In The Madagascar Penguins in a Christmas Caper, she is shown to be aggressive with anyone, no matter how courteous people are with her. But in Madagascar: Escape 2 Africa, she appears to be kinder than before, even leading the New Yorkers when she notices that they are in panic, only being aggressive with wild animals; which she sees as no different from domestic animals. She is also shown to be a soft and grandmotherly figure to the New Yorkers. For example, when a man helps her find her handbag, she says, "Such a good boy. Nana can't survive without it." Nana seems to be incredibly resistant to injury, as she was able to have another fight with Alex right after being tugged out of the back of a speeding tour Jeep as well as being thrown through the windshield a second time by the penguins, who reversed over her in the jeep after noticing that she did not die. Despite her martial arts skills, she is still portrayed as a "little old lady"; she has a waddling gait, wears dentures, and is knocked onto her back when firing a gun. In the first movie, Nana crosses paths with Alex in Grand Central Station, then brutally assaults him. Throughout the series, she refers to Alex as "the bad kitty." She also hits Melman with her hand bag, causing his head to get stuck in the Grand Central Station Clock. When the animals are surrounded by police, she somehow gets past and kicks Alex in "the batteries" (or his groin). She was quickly taken away by police. As shown in the sequel, she was not arrested, she was interviewed as a witness, and states what she thought of Alex: "He was a very bad kitty." Nana is featured in The Madagascar Penguins in a Christmas Caper, where she proves that there are times when she is shown to be not only aggressive with animals, but with also people, like when she destroys random merchandise at a kiosk while shopping for her dog, then demands to purchase Private in a very rude tone, when she refuses to pay the taxi driver her fare, when she tells her doorman to "buzz off" and then punches him in the face for no reason, and even when she does not hold the elevator for Skipper, Kowalski, and Rico. Nana returns in Madagascar: Escape 2 Africa. She also becomes the leader of an army of tourists left stranded by the penguins' schemes. She again crosses paths with Alex, then fights him, and wins again, although Alex puts up much more of a fight this time (although Alex confesses to his friends that he actually only did it to distract her to get her bag, making Nana's victory unofficial). She often hits Alex and loves her handbag. At the end of the film, Alex gives Makunga Nana's handbag. When she sees Makunga holding it, she kicks him in the groin, steps on his foot, whacks his hand with a ruler, digs her hand into his ear, arm-burns him, and spanks him before dragging him off the reserve by his ear. According to the DVD commentary, she took Makunga back to New York with her in a kitty cage. Nana's assault on Alex at Grand Central Station is mentioned by a taxi driver in The Penguins of Madagascar episode "Zoo Tube". Nana does not appear in Madagascar 3: Europe's Most Wanted.
 Mr. Chew is a small, white poodle, fond of chewing and tearing various items apart (as demonstrated on an Alex plush toy). Chew is owned by Nana, and lives in her apartment on the top floor in an apartment complex. Nana purchased Private, mistaking him for a squeaky toy, while he was attempting to find a gift for Ted, and reveals him to be a Christmas present for Mr. Chew. After that, Private gets stuffed in a Christmas stocking, whilst he gets nearly mauled by Chew. Nana was watching a football game on her TV and was too busy to realize that Chew was trying to kill Private. After that, Chew was defeated by Skipper, Kowalski and Rico, who had set out to rescue Private. Nana does not hear the fight, but after she sees the damage (following hearing Rico's dynamite stick going off), she blames Mr. Chew for destroying her apartment and puts him on a big "time out". Mr. Chew had a cameo appearance in Madagascar 3: Europe's Most Wanted when an identical poodle was seen as a head trophy owned by Captain Chantel DuBois.
 The fossa (voiced by Tom McGrath and Eric Darnell in the film, various voices in All Hail King Julien) appear as medium-sized weasel-like creatures, closely related to mongoose, and rarely speak, instead usually growling and yelping. Throughout Madagascar, they are shown to terrorize the lemurs and attempt to eat them. According to Julien, "They're always annoying us [the lemurs] by trespassing, interrupting our parties, and ripping our limbs off." The fossa are fearful of Alex, and run away when they suspect an attack from him, as well as allow him to take their prey. The fossa are defeated by Alex, Marty, Gloria, Melman, and the penguins and driven into their territory. In a "The Penguins of Madagascar" episode, "The Terror of Madagascar," a baby Fossa (voiced by Dee Bradley Baker) was shipped to the Central Park Zoo as part of a zoo-to-zoo tour. Throughout the episode, the baby fossa kept biting King Julien. Because of this, he thought that the fossa was trying to eat him. Kowalski told him that this was the fossa's way of showing love towards Julien, since he thought of him as his father. But, Julien realized in horror this too late, because in order to get rid of the fossa, he shipped in an evil Spanish boa constrictor named Savio to devour him. In order to keep the fossa safe, Julien wanted Savio to eat him instead, but the fossa attacked Savio to protect Julien, much to the penguins' disappointment. The Fossa are recurring characters in All Hail King Julien. During his reign, King Julien's uncle King Julien XII had kept the lemur kingdom quiet in order to keep the Fossa from attacking them. His uncle gives Julien the crown after learning that the king of the lemurs will be eaten by the Fossa. But Julien got bitten on the butt, while saving the lemurs and his scream sent boulders falling down and the Fossa run away. Throughout the first movie and the two TV series, there have been male Fossa. In the fifth episode of All Hail King Julien there is a Fossa girl who flirts with Julien and Maurice in a Fossa suit. She is seen in the end cuddling the suit with Julien's uncle in it who is being punished and sparred by Julien, for sending his nephew to the territory and trying to reclaim the throne. Julien is, at one point, able to tame a Fossa girl named Mary Anne who later becomes a partial leader of the Fossa.
 Makunga (voiced by Alec Baldwin in the film, John Cygan in the video game) is a male lion with a large black mane styled in a pompadour and has green eyes. He is Zuba's rival and wants to take his place as alpha lion. When asked why he wants to become alpha lion, he replies "I'm better looking, I have better hair, I'm deceivingly smart, and I want everyone else to do what I say". Makunga usually acts like he thinks he is smart and has good leadership, but he only is trying to become alpha lion because he wants to be in charge. Makunga often looks at other characters while making an evil unnoticed face where he crosses his arms in front of his chest and makes a big smirk, usually when he is planning to do something that is not good. Makunga often challenged Zuba to fights over the alpha lion position, but was easily beaten. One of those fights led to Zuba being distracted while Alex was captured by poachers. Years later, Makunga used Alex in a bid to finally reach the rank of alpha lion where he tricked Alex into challenging his henchman Teetsi. When Alex was defeated, Zuba reluctantly had to give up his alpha lion status and go into exile with his family. Makunga is not a very good leader saying the only solution to the fact that the local water hole was nearly dry was that they would all have to fight for it. This causes doubt about his role as alpha lion and almost every animal on the reserve wants Zuba back. After the water was restored, he still refused to allow Zuba and Alex to return from banishment. Makunga eventually meets his downfall when being tricked into angering Nana, who attacks Makunga and drags him off the reserve by his ear. The DVD commentary reveals that "Nana brought Makunga to New York in a kitty cage". Due to his goals and design, fans and viewers called him comedic parody of Scar from The Lion King.
 Teetsi (voiced by Fred Tatasciore) is Makunga's henchman and the strongest lion in his group who hides his true nature in a laid back appearance. Makunga tricked Alex by suggesting that he goes up against Teetsi. Alex ended up defeated by Teetsi who then proceeded to place the Hat of Shame on him on Makunga's orders.
 Captain Chantel DuBois (voiced by Frances McDormand) is a Monacan animal control officer. She is the best animal control officer in Monte Carlo with a perfect success record. She is a big-game hunter and has extraordinary tracking skills, as well as superhuman strength and a habit of mounting the heads of every animal she has caught on her wall. Like Nana, she is incredibly resistant to injury. Throughout the third film, she pursues the Four in hopes of having Alex's head as a trophy. The obstacles DuBois avoid during her and her team's chase behind the animals' SUV in Monte Carlo are sliding past some omega-3 fish being spilled on the road while carrying her scooter up high, driving from one building to the other in slow motion after jumping off her scooter (where the animals are preparing to get on the plane), and doing some stunts in an office building. She finally captured Alex and the other animals at New York City, and the zoo staff thank her incorrectly believing that she tried to return Alex. She rips up the check they give her where she says that "It wasn't about the money. It was about the lion." Alex is caged and DuBois hides a poison filled dart in a foam finger and shoots it at him, but the circus animals, being alerted by King Julien, arrive and rescue him. After a long fight between the animals and DuBois and her henchmen, DuBois is tranquilized by Mort and her men are knocked out. She and her men are last seen shipped to Madagascar with her henchmen (similar to the first movie) thanks to the Penguins.
 DuBois' Men are four men of Captain DuBois' animal control officers. They are prone to getting hurt, unlike their boss. However, even when they do get hurt, DuBois can heal them instantly simply by singing "Non, je ne regrette rien," thereby appealing to their patriotism. One is short, one is tall and skinny with a mustache (on an extra released on the DVD reveals his name is Gerard), one is overweight with a goatee and sideburns, and one is also overweight and has a mustache.
 Dave (voiced by John Malkovich) is a purple Giant Pacific octopus who appears in Penguins of Madagascar as the main antagonist. He disguises himself as a human professor under the alias of Dr. Octavius Brine. Dave used to be one of the top attractions at the Central Park Zoo, in which time he entertained children with his clever and funny tricks. However, when Skipper, Kowalski, Rico and Private arrived, they unknowingly stole all his glory due to their cuteness and he was forcibly removed from his home. Afterwards, Dave was shipped to every major Zoo in the world, but the same thing happened again and again and again: penguins getting all the attention while Dave was shunned, ignored and neglected. Embittered, Dave now seeks revenge on the penguin species, becoming a mad scientist in the process.  Inside his submarine lair, Dave creates the Medusa serum, a green substance that when fired in a ray will transform its target into a physically and mentally disfigured monster. He plans to use it on all the penguins that stole his fame and then unleash the now monstrous penguins on New York city, so that the humans will despise them instead of love them. However, a group of Arctic animals called the "North Wind" attempt to foil his plans. At the end of the film, Dave's plan for revenge is foiled and the vengeful octopus is shrunk by his own ray (the effects having been reversed by Private) and gets trapped in a snow globe, where he is admired by a little girl.
 Dave's Henchmen are octopuses. They are evil minions who work for Dave and assist him in his plans to rid of all penguins. They don't speak, but they make a bubbling "octopus" sound that Dave understands. Each henchman share the first names of famous celebrities. Whenever Dave ordered them to do something, he would say the actor's first name and an action word that spells out the actors' full names (Ex. "Nicolas, cage them." "Elijah, would you please take them away?" "Halle, bury them." "Hugh, Jack, man the battle stations." "Charlize, they're on the ray". "Helen, hunt them down". " William, hurt them". Robin, write this down". "Kevin, bake on, we're still gonna need that victory cake". "Drew, Barry, more power."). About nine of these underlings are named after the actors.

The Penguins of Madagascar TV series
 Marlene (voiced by Nicole Sullivan in normal form, Dee Bradley Baker in wild form) is the Central Park Zoo's only resident oriental small-clawed otter with primarily brown fur, with a white chest, face, and right foot. Marlene is shown to be both playful and kind towards others, which often conflicts with Skipper's serious and safety-cautious attitude. Though this is true, the two still share a very strong friendship with one another and still have the ability to keep that certain bond exceedingly strong, making it rather difficult to break. She attempts to find and bring out the best in others through kindness, though is not immune to feeling anger towards Rhonda, a rude walrus apathetic to others, and works to have her transferred (she regrets the decision after learning Rhonda would be sent to a polar bear reserve, and works doggedly to send her elsewhere). Despite having doubts on the penguins' ways of dealing with issues, Marlene still believes that they can accomplish very difficult tasks. Marlene is known to snore very loudly while asleep, which invokes fear in an alligator named Roger residing in the sewer system beneath her enclosure. Like other residents at the zoo, Marlene is shown to love both popcorn and candy. In order to get candy, she is bribed by Maurice to celebrate King Julien Day and participate in several tasks to keep Julien content. Marlene has also revealed that she won the Internet popularity contest at her past zoo three years in a row (though was unable to compete at the Central Park Zoo due to a scandal) and that she considers Christmas in July "the biggest holiday of the year". In "Otter Gone Wild", it is revealed that she was born in captivity. When she sets foot in the outside world, she becomes wild. In her primal state, she briefly becomes infatuated with King Julien, and is capable of posing a significant threat even to the equally-psychotic Rico in a fight, later successfully defeating two enraged badgers who had just given the entire penguin team significant trouble. In "Otter Things Have Happened", the penguins invented a machine that is able to locate anyone's ideal match at a moment's notice; the birds misread the signal her saliva sample gave and present her with Fred the Squirrel, upsetting Julien who kidnaps the little guy (who Marlene has actually started to like). When she realizes Fred is not good for her, she dumps Fred and goes back to her single lifestyle. Kowalski, upset that his invention is faulty, throws it out. In the trash the machine begins to show the results of Marlene's test again; we see Fred in the area it was picking up, but then are treated to the introduction of a brand new character, Antonio or the "Otter Bachelor of Central Park", a buff, Latino male otter who has a fancy to frequently playing his Spanish guitar. It is not finalized, but it seems that Antonio was the individual who Marlene's test picked up, not Fred. It is not known yet if the penguins know of Antonio's existence or if Marlene will get to meet him in future episodes but in "The Lost Treasure of the Golden Squirrel" it is shown that Marlene dreams of being in a spacious room surrounded by many otters very similar (if not exactly like) Antonio all playing Spanish Guitars.  In "Dr. Blowhole's Revenge", it is shown that she believes Dr. Blowhole is not real. In "The Return of the Revenge of Dr. Blowhole," she saw that he was real, though made no comment concerning any prior disbelief. During "The Otter Woman", an over-chlorinated pool resulted in Marlene's fur being bleached white, causing her to be mistaken for an arctic mink called "Arlene," resulting in Skipper and Julien becoming infatuated with her before Skipper became convinced that "Arlene" had done something horrible to the seemingly missing Marlene. Later, Marlene's fur was dyed back to its original color by Alice when she noticed what happened to Marlene. In "Littlefoot," Marlene was separated from her feral self thanks to Kowalski's latest invention, but the separation resulted in her monstrous alter-ego going on the rampage while 'regular' Marlene was now excessively paranoid and afraid of everything around her. Despite Officer X capturing Marlene's feral self and taking her to animal control after feral Marlene went on a rampage that destroyed most of New York- earning the name 'Littlefoot' in the process-, the penguins managed to recombine Marlene's two selves, making Officer X lose his job again, and the experience of confronting her other self allowing Marlene to gain greater control over her feral side. In "Badger Pride," Marlene had to put up with the attacks from Becky and Stacy Badger (who are prone to having to put up with badger stereotypes) and her wild side comes in handy when it came to subduing them.
 Alice (voiced by Mary Scheer) is a zookeeper exclusive to The Penguins of Madagascar. She seems to dislike aspects of her job, and is happy to have a voice-automated robot guide give directions so she can avoid "annoying tour group questions". She also does not understand what people enjoy about watching animals on their computer, saying that they do not do anything interesting. Alice is involved in several aspects of the animal's well-being. It's hinted that deep down Alice cares for the zoo animals and only wants what's best for them as she hates it when people feed the animals popcorn, and posts several signs throughout the zoo after catching a child feeding Marlene a kernel. Though this could just be herself keeping her job safe. Alice is also in charge of gathering the penguins for visits to the veterinarian, and later remarks that they have a dentist appointment (Private then confusedly states that they do not have teeth). Alice and the penguins have a mutual dislike for each other, and she believes that they are scheming (though she is actually correct in this assumption). Though another zookeeper can be heard over her walkie-talkie, voiced by John DiMaggio, Alice is usually the only one ever seen on-screen but occasionally an unnamed zoo worker appears sporadically, though his face is always hidden. Unintentionally, Alice won the zoo's internet popularity contest when a camera documenting the animals was accidentally pushed toward her dancing and slapping her butt in the kitchen. In "Miss Understanding", she remarked to a know-it-all kid that the zoo had three male penguins and one female, which turned out to be false (not that she knew or cared, either of which could be true).
 Pervis McSlade (voiced by Gary Cole) is the zoo commissioner of the Central Park Zoo. Pervis McSlade first appeared in "In The Line of Doody." He is the commissioner for the Central Park Zoo. He was making an appearance to announce the opening of the Children's Zoo. Skipper saved him from being hit by a pigeon named Frankie. He later appears in "The Hoboken Surprise" to make Frances Alberta the new zookeeper of Central Park. When he finds out Frances was building bio mechanical androids to replace the animals with, he fired her.
 This unnamed doctor (voiced by Brian George in an Asian-Indian accent) works as a veterinarian at the Central Park Zoo. He works in the "animal care" building. Unlike Alice, he seems to be quite fond of animals. He is bald and wears a white lab coat. Skipper often voices dislike of him because of his use of needles and when injured, he has been known to try and downplay the injury rather than visit the vet.
 Chuck Charles (voiced by Jeff Bennett) is a newsman who works at Channel-1. In "The All Nighter Before Christmas," he mentions that he is so used to talking on television that he has forgotten how to talk normally. Due to an unknown reason in "Goodnight and Good Chuck," he was fired and replaced with his rival anchor Pete Peters and he got a new job at the zoo as Alice's assistant. But he was sat on by Burt, swung out of control by Bada and Bing, tried to get a chameleon off of his face, being dragged away by a vehicle that drove itself, almost got flushed down a toilet, jumped on by Mort, and got sprayed by the amnesia spray by the Penguins. He tried to get his old job back by exposing the Penguins' operation to the world and he got past Rico, Private and Kowalski. The disc was taken by Pete Peters and Peters aired it. But when the world thought the Penguins' operation was fake, Pete Peters was fired and Chuck Charles was reinstated.
 The Rat King (voiced by Diedrich Bader) is a genetically enhanced, muscular lab rat who resides in the sewer. He constantly torments the penguins and never learns his lesson when he's defeated each time. He even tries to take over their home in a hockey game, but he is defeated by King Julien after Rat King's fellow rats skated over King Julien's feet. Also he is matched power with Skipper.
 The Sewer Rats (voiced by Jeff Bennett and Kevin Michael Richardson) are countless small sewer rats who are friends and minions of Rat King.
 Officer X (voiced by Cedric Yarbrough) is a New York animal control officer who has a single-minded focus on removing stray animals from the streets. Officer X is shown to have a superhuman level of strength, crushing a small metal cage with his bare hands and defeating Joey, who even the penguins could not easily beat, head on, leading Skipper to say Officer X cannot be human.  He first tangles with the penguins when they interfere with his pursuit of a stray cat, the penguins' friend Max, in the episode "Cat's Cradle". When asked by Alice what his real name was, X responds that his mother never told him his real name, instead telling him that it was "classified." Officer X was defeated by a Red Rhodesian Slasher that was painted to look like Max. X returns in the episode "What Goes Around" when he tries to capture the penguins when they are found out of the zoo on the streets of New York, but the subsequent chase results in X losing his job due to the scale of the damage he had caused and the public's lack of belief that penguins were responsible for his actions. He was arrested on vandalism charges creating the mess resulting from his and the penguins' encounter. He returns as an exterminator in "Stop Bugging Me," having been forced to work as an exterminator after his previous rampage. He fights with the penguins who are protecting three cockroaches that Rico befriended. X was ready to enact his revenge, only for Private to cause the cockroaches to crawl into his suit causing him to run off. He also lost his mustache in this episode. In "The Officer X Factor," he replaces Alice for the weekend when she was sent on a vacation. As a zookeeper, he knew about every inch of the zoo to prevent the penguins' escape into cooler water. He was also expecting that the penguins were going to fly to the East River, but he was defeated there. He landed on the taxi that Alice was returning in as it drives away. Officer X attempted to regain his position in "Littlefoot" by capturing the monster currently attacking New York (the feral version of Marlene that had been separated from her normal self), but the penguins sabotaged this effort by recombining the two Marlenes, leaving Rico behind to give the impression that X's penguin-related "insanity" had prompted him to steal a penguin from the zoo. X loses his job again, leaving him upset. His next appearance was in "A Kipper for Skipper" where he was working as a fishmonger. When Kowalski, Rico, and Private were arguing over the fish, X captured the three of them. Luckily, they were able to defeat him by dropping a bowling ball on him. He was briefly seen in "Goodnight and Good Chuck" in which a video revealing all of the penguins' covert operations were broadcast worldwide. Officer X watched the news segment in Times Square and truimphantly told anyone who would listen that "I told you!" and "I'm not crazy!". He then calls his mother and tells her to turn on the TV to prove his sanity. Unfortunately, everyone else who watches it believes it to be a news hoax due to the sheer impossibility of the scenario and the amusing antics of the penguins in the video. Officer X drops to his knees and cries out in despair when still no one believes him. In "Snowmageddon", X is now stacking shelves. When Skipper and Marlene go out for a snack run and a snowstorm traps them in the same shop, X manages to capture Skipper, and ties him up with a licorice whip then cages him under a plastic crate, which he sits on while calling animal control. Marlene helps to free Skipper and thanks to the destruction it can be assumed that X has lost his job again.
 Joey (voiced by James Patrick Stuart) is a bad-tempered and hostile red kangaroo with an Australian accent that always refers to himself in the third person who loves beating up anyone who steps foot in his habitat, especially Skipper and Julien. He first appeared in the season one episode, "Assault and Batteries" and later on in "Cat's Cradle" when he tried to beat up Officer X but was badly hurt instead. He also appeared to have a big role in "Skorca!" In the season two episode, "Kanga-Management", the Penguins accidentally destroy the Koala habitat, forcing Leonard to temporarily live with Joey until the pen is re-built, to both's dismay. Eventually, the two settle their differences and become friends, agreeing on their hatred for the penguins.
 Leonard (voiced by Dana Snyder) is an extremely paranoid and nervous koala. He first appeared in "Night and Dazed", where he was shown to be very afraid of the penguins. After being accidentally launched into the city due to Kowalski's evacuation launcher, the penguins come save him and bring him back to the zoo. He appears again in "Kanga Management" in which the penguins accidentally destroy his enclosure, forcing him to temporarily live in Joey's enclosure. He and Joey eventually become friends due to their hatred for the penguins. In "Nighty Night Ninja", he watches a martial arts film with the penguins while he waits for his home to air out, due to a fish bomb. This causes him to start attacking the other animals in a sleep-walking state the next day. The penguins cure him by making him watch The Lunacorns, and save him from the sewer rats, whom he had attacked earlier.
 Hans (voiced by John DiMaggio) is a puffin with a past history with Skipper that involves a mission in Denmark that somehow resulted in Skipper being declared Public Enemy Number One in the country in question. During "Huffin & Puffin", he appeared in New York, initially apparently wanting to make peace with Skipper, before his true agenda was revealed to be his attempt to take control of the Penguins' lair for revenge. With Skipper having infiltrated the lair and defeated Hans, he was then shipped to the Hoboken Zoo. He appeared in "The Hoboken Surprise" and helped the penguins defeat the animal androids who had taken over the Hoboken Zoo. He appeared in "The Return of the Revenge of Doctor Blowhole", working with Doctor Blowhole as part of a plan to take Skipper's memories away.
 Dr. Blowhole (voiced by Neil Patrick Harris) is an evil, mad bottlenose dolphin scientist and supervillain, who plans to take revenge on the human race: In the past, Blowhole was known as "Flippy", and was forced by humans to perform tricks at Coney Island for their own amusement. Dr. Blowhole is Skipper's arch-nemesis. He only has one (real) eye; his right eye is a robotic one, which hides a scar. He is described by Private and Skipper as being "pure evil, with skin that's surprisingly pleasant to the touch", which Blowhole claims is because he always moisturizes. He appears to love rubbing it in that he has far superior technology than the penguins do, which usually gets on Kowalski's nerves. Since he is a dolphin, he gets around by the use of a Segway-type vehicle while on land, which also projects a glass dome around it and Blowhole to turn into an escape vehicle. He also has a habit of referring to the penguins as "pen-gyoo-wins" (it is implied that he only does this to tick them off). Dr. Blowhole has a habit of having his deep-voiced computer announce the names of his creations in a dramatic voice (provided by Jim Cummings) instead of saying them himself (i.e. Chrome Claw). Unlike most cartoon villains, instead of simply leaving his enemies to die in a deathtrap, he typically stays to oversee their destruction personally, well aware they will likely escape somehow (telling Julien as much when asked), unless he'd be killed as well if he stays (such as locking them in his base as it self-destructs). In the special, the evil dolphin also proved able to hold his own with the combat-trained Skipper in a short physical fight. Dr. Blowhole is mentioned in the episode "Eclipsed". Blowhole apparently had a plan to extinguish the Sun, as when Private told him that the sun went dark, Skipper believed that Dr. Blowhole had succeeded in his plan, but actually the sun went dark because of a solar eclipse.  In "Roomies", Blowhole sends a walrus spy, named Rhonda a.k.a. Agent 12, to steal Kowalski's "plasma cutter" invention, which acts as a chain saw. The villainous dolphin himself is never seen the episode.  Dr. Blowhole kidnaps King Julien, believing him to be Skipper's best friend, in an effort to lure the flightless force into a trap so that he can annihilate them once and for all. Julien and Blowhole join forces and captures the "pen-gu-wins". After Blowhole reveals his plan to activate a "Ring of Fire" that he built in the North Pole to flood the world (saying it was inspired by a ring of fire he was forced to jump through when he was in captivity), Mort appears from the lair's skylight and frees the penguins after crashing into a control panel. Blowhole then activates the Ring of Fire after throwing Mort from the control panel. He then sends a giant mutated lobster he devised earlier in the episode called Chrome Claw after Skipper and the penguins (which he'd mentioned he was planning to create during their previous encounter) but they manage to defeat it. After a short battle with Skipper, Blowhole is betrayed by Julien, who claims to have been a double agent the entire time, and the "Ring of Fire" (which the media has dubbed the "Hoop of Heat", much to Blowhole's anger) is deactivated. Blowhole escapes, promising revenge. Doctor Blowhole was referenced in "Invention Intervention", where Skipper assumed that Kowalski's out-of-control invisible invisibility ray was actually created by Blowhole, commenting that his arch-nemesis had become far more intelligent – if harder to follow given the lack of motive behind such an attack – since their last confrontation. In "The Return of the Revenge of Dr. Blowhole", Dr. Blowhole helps Skipper's rival, Hans the Puffin, escape the Hoboken Zoo so he can lure Skipper into a trap. Once he ambushed him, he uses his clown-shaped "Mind Jacker" to steal Skipper's memories so he can use them to infiltrate the penguins' lair so he can turn them into his monster slaves using his "Diaboligizer". When he is about to blast the penguins with the Diaboligizer, he misfires, causing it to hit King Julien's MP3 player infused with Kowalski's experimental power cell (which Julien foolishly thought was a battery). The mix of the three resulted in a giant MP3 monster, which made everyone near it sing uncontrollably. Blowhole soon decides to use the creature to his advantage by winning it over with his beautiful singing voice. Once he was in control, he started using it to destroy New York City. Fortunately, Skipper returned to New York with the help of a spirit guide in the form of Alex the lion as seen earlier in the movie. Skipper distracted Blowhole while the penguins took out the source of the monster's power. With Blowhole foiled again and the monster back to normal, he tried to escape, but Skipper activated the Mind Jacker on Blowhole, wiping out his memories. He was soon returned to Coney Island under his old name of Flippy the Dolphin, where he was forced to jump through the Ring of Fire once again.  He is also mentioned in "The Big S.T.A.N.K", where he was the reason that S.T.A.N.K was created, to lure him to the toilet-shaped stink bomb, but the project was abandoned with the realization that dolphins don't use toilets. He was mentioned again in "Operation: Big Blue Marble" when Skipper suggested Blowhole as a suspect for the recent environmental chaos and random weather conditions that they were experiencing, but Kowalski confirmed that Blowhole was still at Coney Island as Flippy. In "The Penguin Who Loved Me", it is revealed that Doris the Dolphin (Kowalski's love interest) is his sister and his real name is Francis (which Red One, one of his Lobster minions, laughed off). He only created the name Dr. Blowhole since it earned him more respect.
 Rhonda (voiced by Kathy Kinney) is a very rude, unhygenic, lazy and obnoxious walrus (though she is depicted with buckteeth instead of tusks). She appears in the episode "Roomies" where she is transferred into Marlene's habitat. At first Marlene is excited to have another girl to hang out with, but gets annoyed by Rhonda very quickly due to her disgusting and obnoxious behavior. She asks the penguins to ship her out overnight, but stops the shipment after hearing she is getting taken to a polar bear reserve.  Instead they send her to the Hoboken Zoo. At the end, we see that she is one of Dr. Blowhole's agents and stole Kowalski's plasma cutter. She appears again, as an ally this time, in "The Hoboken Surprise" where she Hans, Clemson, Lulu and Savio help the penguins fight off animal androids in the Hoboken Zoo.
 Bada (voiced by John DiMaggio) and Bing (voiced by Kevin Michael Richardson in Brooklyn accents) are giant eastern lowland gorillas. Bada is a gray-furred gorilla and Bing is a brown-furred gorilla. First shown in the "Kingdom Come" episode when they served as thuggish bodyguards for Maurice, they have been seen displaying softer sides upon other occasions, such as when they looked after Mort in "The Penguin Stays in the Picture" while a photographer was there as an unrequested favor to Private, who wanted to be on the cover of the zoo brochure. The two are attacked by a super-enlarged Mort in the episode "Mort Unbound" in order for him to get King Julien's stolen mango back. In "Truth Ache," it is revealed that Bing sleeps with a stuffed rabbit named Mr. Bunny.
 Burt (voiced by John DiMaggio in the TV series, Fred Tatasciore in the video games) is an Indian elephant who was just an extra zoo animal during the beginning of the series, but then evolved into a character of greater focus as the series evolved. He was central to the episode "An Elephant Never Forgets", in which he leaves the zoo to locate a man who had irritated him as a boy by playing his kazoo at the zoo. In the 2005 video game version of Madagascar, Burt was called Darnell.. Burt is shown to be obsessed with peanuts, and when he does not eat them, he goes insane as shown in "Jungle Law". He nearly eats Julien when he mistakes him for a peanut. He played a vital role in the penguins' defeat of the ruthless boa constrictor Savio due to his sheer size preventing Savio from attacking him, squeezing Savio so that the snake's previously-swallowed victims were released.
 Roger (voiced by Richard Kind) is the penguins' American alligator friend who lives in the sewer. They meet him in the episode "Haunted Habitat" when Skipper and Marlene go to investigate in the sewer under Marlene's habitat because of a strange sound. Roger tells the penguins that he is from Florida and that he was the pet of a young boy until he was flushed into the sewers by the boy's parents. He appears again in "Roger Dodger" when the Sewer Rats terrorize him. Kowalski swapped his mind with Rico's to drive away the Sewer Rats and then had to work to get their minds back into their respectful bodies. Roger is uncomfortable in Rico's body and keeps regurgitating weapons uncontrollably, despite his pacifist nature.  In "Gator Watch," the overload of sewage causes problems for Roger at the time when the penguins were visiting him. The penguins had to work to find the right home for him since the "zoo overlords" would be surprised at the sudden appearance of Roger. First they tried a park with Roger disguised as a log. A woman recognized him. Then the penguins try to disguise Roger as an exhibit at the museum. Two boys ended up giving Roger away. Another idea was to have Roger pose as a gargoyle at the top of a building. Roger fell off the building and into a populated swimming pool. This caused the entire city to end up in a Gator Watch which ended with Roger getting captured by animal control at a theater. When the penguins worked to free Roger, the location Roger was taken to was the Central Park Zoo where an alligator habitat has been set up by the zoo staff. Since then, he has made background appearances.
 Max (voiced by Wayne Knight) is the penguins' stray tabby cat friend who lives in an alley near Central Park. He first meets the four penguins in the episode "Launchtime" when the penguins end up on a rooftop across the street from the zoo instead of on the moon. At first, the penguins thought he was a "mooncat", but at the end they figure out he was just a stray cat. Max is skinny and hopes to catch a bird in his life. He at first wanted to eat the penguins, but was so touched when he was given a can of fish by them that he became their friend instead. He has a very small cameo in "The Helmet". In "Cat's Cradle", Max tried to escape Officer X. With help from the Penguins, Max and penguins managed to trick Officer X into getting attacked by a wildcat called the Red Rhodesian Slasher.  He appears once more in "Street Smarts" where Max helps the Penguins retrieve Mort from Elmer by teaching them how to be a dog. In the end, Max and Elmer become close friends, but only because Elmer thinks that Max is a lemur.
 The Duck Family are a family of ducks that live in a pond in Central Park.
 Mother Duck (voiced by Tara Strong) is a white duck who is the mother of Bradley, Samuel, Ramona, and Eggy.
 Eggy (voiced by Tara Strong) is a duckling who is the son of Mother Duck and the brother of Ramona, Samuel and Bradley. In "Paternal Egg-Stinct," Marlene found an abandoned egg in her habitat. She gave it to the penguins to look after. Julien wanted the egg for himself. He called it Julien Junior, or JJ for short. Private called the egg Eggy. At the end, Marlene brings Mother Duck to the penguins to get her duckling back.  Unfortunately, the effects of the Penguins' training goes to a point where Mother Duck asks the Penguins to do something to stop him as seen in "Hard Boiled Eggy." Their attempts to show Eggy the dangerous portion of their missions fails, as the duckling goes on a rampage taking down all the animals in the zoo where Eggy inherits the penguins' traits; Skipper's drive, Kowalski's tatical mind, Rico's psychosis and Private's "fake" British accent.
 Ramona, Bradley and Samuel (voiced by Jessica DiCicco) are ducklings who are Eggy's siblings and Mother Duck's children. Like Eggy's previous personas before becoming more like Julien in Hard Boiled Eggy, they crave action and mayhem.
 Fred (voiced by Fred Stoller) is a dimwitted squirrel that lives in Central Park and takes everything said literally and has a slow, unemphatic speech pattern. Kowalski met Fred briefly in the "Otter Gone Wild" episode, while the full penguin group met him in "Mask of the Raccoon" where he is friends with Archie despite the fact that Archie is no good. He dated Marlene in "Otter Things Have Happened", but she broke up with him because what she had thought was him being funny turned out to be just Fred's ignorance. In "Field Tripped," Julien recruited him to be the 'smart one' of Julien's all-mammal penguin-team-equivalent. Fred was part of a treasure hunt in the episode "The Lost Treasure of the Golden Squirrel".
 Roy (voiced by Danny Jacobs) is a short-tempered white rhinoceros, appearing predominantly as an extra zoo animal for the majority of the series. When given more of a role, he often appears to have little-to-no patience for any animal that provokes him, usually responding with threats, such as when a truth-telling Private nearly revealed a secret about him in the "Truth Ache" episode involving a "vacation" in Tijuana. He plays a pivotal role in the "April Fools" episode when he threatens Julien with retaliation for drawing on his backside with a permanent marker. It is revealed that he was working with the penguins to teach Julien a lesson for his constant April Fools' Day pranks on everyone in August. In "Antics on Ice", it was revealed that he is a fan of the Lunacorns series due to their positive focus on a horned animal. Twice in the episode "Action Reaction," he sat on Julien.
 Pinky (voiced by Kevin Michael Richardson) is a sassy American flamingo, who usually only appears as an extra zoo animal in the series. Her only main role, so far, has been in her debut episode "Go Fish." In this episode she was used for aerial support when the penguins wanted to take fish from a fish delivery truck. Somehow she wound up getting all the fish for herself by the end of the episode. In the episode "Operation: Good Deed" the penguins need one of Pinky's feathers so that Julien would let Maurice massage Mason. She agrees to give them one after they got her peanuts through a series of additional tasks.
 Darla (voiced by Grey DeLisle in a Western accent) is a very tough, unfriendly, aggressive, tomboyish, determined but also kind-hearted, sweet and caring Guinea baboon. She appears mainly as a background zoo animal. She was first mentioned in "Assault and Batteries", but made her first appearance in "Out of the Groove". In this episode, she stole Julien's groove after he skunk-bombed her. After several attempts by the Penguins to get the groove back, she finally gives it back when Skipper manages to make Julien apologize. She had her second major role in "Hair Apparent". In this episode, she began pampering Maurice (thinking he was a male baboon after he got most of his tail fur ripped off, got red paint on his bottom, and got Commissioner McSlade's toupee stuck on his head making Julien jealous. The penguins later take the wig from Maurice to return it, making Darla angry to find out Maurice is a lemur. By the end of the episode, she decides to pamper Mort instead.
 Carol and Jillian (voiced by Grey DeLisle) are Darla's baboon friends who are often seen with her.
 Shelly (voiced by Melissa McCarthy) is an ostrich who lives in the Central Park Zoo. For most of the series, she only appears as a background zoo animal. Her first major role and her first speaking role so far is in the episode "Love Takes Flightless". In this episode she falls for Rico after he saves her from being frozen in cement by demolishing it. She tries to get Rico's attention by hiding his doll in the dumpster. After seeing how upset Rico was about it, she helps the penguins get it back from the garbage truck. At the end, Shelly gets herself a muscular male doll and becomes happy with it.
 Becky and Stacy (voiced by Jennette McCurdy and Victoria Justice) are two American badgers that are residents of the zoo. It hasn't been revealed if they are either friends or sisters. They are prone to having to put up with badger stereotypes. Private was initially fearful of badgers, but Becky and Stacy won his heart by giving him Peanut Butter Winkies. After Private left, Becky and Stacy started badgering Marlene into doing wild and crazy things with them. Marlene, annoyed, tells them to stop badgering her. They ended up attacking Marlene due to the use of badger stereotypes. They were eventually defeated when Marlene fell outside the park and went into her wild state. After that incident, Becky and Stacy appear to respect and fear Marlene since they all have a picnic with the penguins in the park with the two of them being held in between wild Marlene's arms. Becky and Stacy both make a reappearance in "Tunnel of Love," where they fall in love with the beavers and romance interferes with the beavers' work.
 Randy (voiced by Will Friedle) is a sheep who lives at the Children's Zoo at the Central Park Zoo. Children are constantly coming to pet him. Many of them have sticky hands due to eating too much candy. In his debut episode "Can't Touch This," one kid in particular hits him and rips his fur until finally Randy cannot stand the torture any longer resulting in Randy biting the kid. The kid screams, causing Alice to come and see what the problem is. The penguins hear the boy's cry as well. When they get there and see the child lie to Alice. Alice apologizes, and puts Randy in a cage. Skipper then says they're going to teach the sheep a lesson for biting a child. Once Randy tells them their story, the Penguins decide to help Randy with his predicament by using various defense methods including: "Repelling" Polymer, Static Electricity, and Hypnosis, all of which backfire. Eventually, Randy ends up back in the Petting Zoo, but as a consultation, Skipper and Rico teach him some self-defense combat techniques to prevent anymore accidents. Randy appears again in "Operation: Neighbor Swap" where he welcomes the Lemurs into the petting zoo but once Julien gets comfortable, he too grows tired and annoyed of his constant bossing. He helps the penguins formulate a plan to get Julien back to his old habitat.
 Muffy, Buffy and Fluffy (voiced by Kristen Schaal) are three adorable, cute, and cuddly rabbits who reside in the Central Park Children's Zoo. As shown in the show they appear to be cute and innocent but they happen to be very good fighters (evident by how they managed to beat up the penguins with ease). They made their first appearance in "Operation: Neighbor Swap," when the Lemurs were transferred to the Petting Zoo. When they met the lemurs, they became loyal to King Julien because they heard he was a king (and because of his "magnificent" tail).
 Clemson (voiced by Larry Miller) is a very descriptive and exuberant bamboo lemur who made his first appearance in the episode "Right Hand Man.". After being transferred to the Central Park Zoo, Clemson tried to replace Maurice as Julien's right hand man by constantly pampering him. Mort (who had suspected Clemson was evil since he arrived) found out that Clemson was planning to ship Julien to the Hoboken Zoo so that he could take over as king. The Penguins later turn the tables on him by pushing Clemson into the crate to be sent off.  Clemson appeared again in "The Hoboken Surprise" where he helped the Penguins fight off the android animals of the Hoboken Zoo. Clemson's returns in "King Me" where he informs the lemurs that Julien can't inherite the crown and nearly wins a contest to see who would be king. He was thwarted when the Penguins switched Clemson's brain with Julien's. Julien in Clemson's body then decrees "Julien" king right before they are switched back. Clemson is then chased back to Hoboken by Bada and Bing after Julien insulted them while still in Clemson's body.
 Lulu (voiced by Jane Leeves) is a female chimpanzee. She first appears in "Monkey Love", in which she was staying at the Central Park Zoo while her habitat in the Hoboken Zoo was being repaired. Once she showed up, Phil fell in love with her. When Mason tries to set the two up, she thinks Mason is asking her out. After several failed attempts by the penguins and King Julien to show off Phil's skills, Phil explains the whole situation to her in American Sign Language and she agrees to go out with him before she has to leave. She appears again in "The Hoboken Surprise", along with Hans, Savio, Clemson and Rhonda, where she helps the penguins fight off the android animals of the Hoboken Zoo.
 Doris (voiced by Calista Flockhart) is a dolphin. Kowalski has a crush on her who is spoken of in several episodes. As shown in "Hot Ice," Kowalski sees her as a love interest, though it appears to be unrequited (since Doris wanted someone "hipper"). Doris makes her first appearance in "The Penguin who Loved Me" and is revealed to be the sister of Dr. Blowhole. She wishes for Kowalski to help her free her brother Francis from captivity along with a platypus named Parker. After the penguins and Parker follow Doris to Seaville, they get to Francis' exhibit where it is revealed he is none other than Dr. Blowhole, who has forgotten who he really is and thinks he's Flippy because of his memories being wiped out and is now happily performing tricks for people. Parker than betrays the Penguins and Doris when he reveals he works for Dr. Blowhole and takes him back to the base where all the Lobsters are. As they try to restore his memories, Doris and The Penguins storm in and the aforementioned characters get in a fight. Soon enough Doris accidentally finds Blowhole's Mind Jacker and Parker uses it to restore his memories. Blowhole then captures the Penguins and Doris, and reveals his evil plan is to fire his new weapon "Project Bad Tidings" at the moon, flood the entire world and rule it. But after Kowalski tricks him and they foil his plan and manage to escape before the base explodes. As soon as they get back home, Doris tells Kolwaski that she likes him now and they kiss for the first time.
 Savio (voiced by Nestor Carbonell) is a large green anaconda (often simply referred to as a boa constrictor) with a Spanish accent who attacked the animals on three occasions. When he was initially transferred to the zoo in "The Big Squeeze", the penguins suspected him of being the cause of the disappearance of the lemurs and Marlene, but his cage appeared inescapable; the only means of departure was a vent that Savio could have used when unfed but would have been unable to access when returning. Skipper realises that he was instead using the vent to access the keypad that controlled his cage locks with his tail, allowing him to open his cage. He was defeated on this occasion when the penguins lured him into Burt's habitat, with Burt throwing Savio around and squeezing him through the bars to expel his previously-eaten victims. Alice later had Savio transferred to the Hoboken Zoo. Savio returned as an enemy in "All Tied Up With a Boa", intending to eat the penguins, the lemurs, and Marlene in revenge for their previous defeat- subsequently intending to regurgitate them and eat them in reverse order to his previous consumption- after immobilising Burt by sending a mouse to the zoo to trick him into running into a wall in panic, but Julien managed to escape by hiding in the popcorn machine and becoming covered in butter, his slippery form resulting in Savio becoming tied up in knots, covered in butter, and sent back to Hoboken. Savio appeared as an ally in "The Hoboken Surprise" where he assisted the penguins in defeating the android animals of the Hoboken Zoo. Savio returns again in "The Terror of Madagascar" when Julien has him transferred back to the zoo as he had hired him to eat a baby fossa that he believes is trying to eat him, but the fossa is revealed to see Julien as a father figure and defeats Savio by biting him and chases him back to Hoboken (While annoying Skipper at the idea that the penguins have now not defeated Savio three times & yells in frustration seeing Savio defeated by the fossa instead of them). It's reveled in this episode that he can speak Spanish, hence his accent. He's also as predatory as the adult fossa.
 The Vesuvius Twins (voiced by Atticus Shaffer) are two schoolboys from a very wealthy family. They are disliked by all of the animals of the zoo because of how nasty they are. Even though they are repeatedly banned from going near the animals, they usually get around the ban because of their parent's wealth, e.g. purchasing all of the tickets for an event at the zoo. Private often encourages others to show kindness to the boys, choosing to believe that they are secretly good.
 Cecil and Brick (voiced by French Stewart and John DiMaggio) are two criminals that have occasionally run afoul of the Penguins.
 Archie (voiced by Rob Paulsen) is a raccoon with a Robin Hood-like motive and a friend of Fred. He first appears in "Mask of the Raccoon" where he has been going around stealing from the zoo and supposedly giving to the poor. His plot was exposed by the Penguins upon learning about him from Fred and ends up having to give to the poor. In "The Big Move," Archie appears as a property agent where he tries to sell Rico a house. In this appearance, he is not in his Robin Hood costume and not using a French accent.
 The Amarillo Kid (voiced by Jeff Bennett) is a nine-banded armadillo. A long time ago, the Amarillo Kid challenged Private to a game of mini golf, back when Private was one of the best mini golf players and was known as Mr. Tux. Private quit after the game, which ended in a tie, because he had to hit a little possum girl's ice cream cone (it was a double scoop) to tie it up. Though Private admitted that the pressure made him quit after all. Several years later in "Mr. Tux," he arrived at the Central Park Zoo to challenge Private to a game to prove he's the best. At first, Private refuses to fight him. Enraged by this, the Kid locked down the entire zoo and threatened to blow it up with a thermonuclear reactor. Private battles him, and though the game is close, Private wins with the help of a cricket he had saved early. Ashamed, the Amarillo Kid leaves. The Amarillo Kid later returns in "Showdown on Fairway 18," but this time has a changed personality. This time, he comes to the Penguins for help when he has lost a mini-golf match against the Gopher Brothers Bo and Gomer and they want his shell (which the Amarillo Kid used in a wager). The Amarillo Kid tells him of the Westchester Putter from Yabogeyhaha, a golden golf putting club which grants its wielder unbeatable power so that even the worst will become the greatest, and he desires to use it in a rematch against the Gophers to save himself. Private and the Amarillo Kid find the Westchester Putter. Through a series of comical foul-ups, they finally claim the Putter. Private hands the Westchester Putter over to the Amarillo Kid on the agreement that he will return it as soon as he has won his rematch. Touched by Private's kindness, the Amarillo Kid confesses his intentions to steal the Putter for the Gophers in order to save his shell as Private's emotions egged him & made him feel guilt for what he was preparing to do. He decides to turn over a new leaf, and voluntarily puts the Putter back, saying he'd rather go shell-less than proving Skipper & Private right that he hadn't changed. Just then, the other penguins and the Gophers show up. The Gophers trap the penguins under a chandelier, take the Westchester Putter for themselves, and escape the building, proving that the Amarillo Kid had been telling the truth and they had tricked Skipper and his team into helping them as Kowalski recapped the gophers' clever ingenuity of their plan. As they make their getaway, the Amarillo Kid stays to free the penguins. The penguins and the Amarillo Kid pursue the Gophers in a mini golf cart chase. Just as it seems the Gophers are going to give the penguins the slip, the Amarillo Kid uses his golfing skills to sabotage their cart and save the Putter. With the Gophers successfully thwarted, the Amarillo Kid thanks Private for believing in him, and they part on good terms... that is, only after Private reminds the Amarillo Kid remembers he is supposed to give the Westchester Putter back.
 Miss Perky (voiced by Tara Strong) is Rico's doll girlfriend. She is a maniac.
 Granny Squirrel (voiced by Debbie Reynolds) first appeared as a granny of Fred in "The Lost Treasure of the Golden Squirrel," but then the gang believed she is a ghost.
 Barry (voiced by Kevin McDonald) is a strawberry poison-dart frog who first appears in the episode "Untouchable" where he is a transfer from the Hoboken Zoo and begins terrorizing the animals by temporarily poisoning Skipper, Kowalski and Rico. Private manages to stop him by putting on a steel suit and hugging him, making Barry realize he only needed a friend. He appears mainly as a background zoo animal in more recent episodes.
 Frankie (voiced by Jeff Bennett) is a homing pigeon who first appeared on "Launchtime."
 The Red Squirrel (voiced by Jeff Bennett) is an evil red squirrel who appears in the episodes "The Red Squirrel," "A Visit From Uncle Nigel," "Our Man in Grrfurjiclestan," and "Nuts to You."
 The Broches are the trio of cockroaches who appears in the episode "Stop Bugging Me."
 Mike (voiced by Zand Broumand) is a member of the Broches.
 Duane (voiced by Brian Posehn) is a member of the Broches.
 'Eddie (voiced by Jerry Trainor) is a member of the Broches.
 Frances Alberta (voiced by Megan Hilty) is the presumptive head zookeeper at the Hoboken Zoo who appeared in the episode "The Hoboken Surprise." Frances was first shown to be a cheerful zookeeper who had worked to clean up the zoo's poor conditions, gaining the respect of resident animals Rhonda, Hans, Clemson, Savio, and Lulu. Frances also afforded the animals under her care many amenities, such as fine cuisine, massage chairs, and a fountain of cheese. It is later revealed that Frances never had the respect of her animals, whom she had simply sealed away under the ground and replaced with android look-alikes, all in an effort to meet her demanding standard for cleanliness and to get the attention of Parks Commissioner Pervis McSlade. At the end of the episode, Commissioner McSlade fires her and the Hoboken Police arrests her for making android look-alike animals and assault of a Bartender.
 Kitka (voiced by Kari Wahlgren) is a female peregrine falcon whom Skipper falls in love with. She only appears in "The Falcon and the Snow Job".
 Shawna W. Smith (voiced by Joanna Garcia) is a zoo nurse who only appears in the episode "Love Hurts".
 Special Agent Buck Rockgut (voiced by Clancy Brown) is a crazy rockhopper penguin who first appears in "The Red Squirrel".
 Hunter (voiced by Ciara Bravo) is a young female leopard seal who doesn't eat penguins. She only appears in the episode "Operation: Antarctica".
 Uncle Nigel (voiced by Peter Capaldi) is Private's uncle, who works as a spy for MI6, and comes to New York to visit his nephew and to find The Red Squirrel. His first, and so far only, appearance is in "A Visit From Uncle Nigel."  When around the penguins (minus Private), Nigel acted like a "posh nancycat". This was all part of his cover story. When captured by The Red Squirrel, Nigel was forced to tell Skipper, Kowalski, and Rico that he actually was a spy. It is unknown if Nigel really is Private's uncle in blood or not (due to being a different species of penguin). Though it is possible that he is either an honorary uncle or perhaps one of Private's parents was the same species of penguin Nigel is and he is their brother whilst the other parent was the same species as Private.
 Blue Hen (voiced by Audrey Wasilewski) is a chicken who is first introduced in "Mental Hen" as a mute animal with psychic powers. Kowalski, being a sceptic, records her and sends the video on internet, hoping someone will figure out that Blue Hen is faking her powers, only for her to gain popularity. She is then revealed to just be extremely intelligent rather than psychic, being able to figure out what's going to happen with analytical thinking. She can also talk and becomes an enemy of penguins after they find out that she was waiting for someone like Kowalski to expose her so that she can gain popularity and power. Unable to defeat her rationally or by fighting, Kowalski sets up a plan to distract her by singing and dancing seductively, leading her to choose the wrong option. While she starts holding a grudge against Kowalski, she compliments his dancing ability and kisses him. She returns in P.E.L.T as an antagonist.
 Manfredi and Johnson (voiced by James Patrick Stuart and Danny Jacobs) are penguins who were former members of Skipper's team. They are typically cited for the nature of their demise or a mistake they made as an example of what can happen if one lets their guard down or neglects their training. The exact method of their demise varies in each instance and in some cases are contradictory: killed by an exploding trap, killed by flying piranhas, losing vital internal organs, etc.  They are finally seen in "The Penguin Who Loved Me", in an enclosure in Seaville both with bruises and injuries, but very much alive. However, they have somehow injured their eyes. Manfredi (the larger sized penguin) has lost his left foot now replaced by a stick while Johnson (the Kowalski-sized penguin) broke his right flipper and seems to have a burn on his body. Johnson noticed the penguins and Doris "flying out" of Seaville and banged on the glass panel for help. Unfortunately for them, the penguins never noticed their desperate pleas and swam away saying they were never going to come back ever again. Strangely they do not appear in Penguins of Madagascar, implying that they may have met the four at a much later time.
 Parker (voiced by Ty Burrel) is a platypus who was in a relationship with Doris, and he was hired by her to bring Kowalski in so that she could convince him to help free her brother, Francis. However, after Francis turned out to actually be Dr. Blowhole, Parker also reveals that he was hired by the lobsters to bring the amnesiac Blowhole back to them so that they could restore his memory. Afterwards, Parker double-crosses them in order to complete his mission.

All Hail King Julien
 Clover (voiced by India de Beaufort) is a green-eyed crowned lemur who is King Julien's bodyguard. She is smart, cunning, (mostly) mature, but tends to be rather paranoid (comes with the job), is brave to the point of recklessness and can be prone to sudden outbursts of violence, but can also be sweet, friendly and kind-hearted towards her friends. In general, she and Maurice tend to be the voice of reason to keep Julien's crazy ideas in check. After the events of the first episode, Clover becomes his commander. She is the main protector of King Julien (since the other guards ran away) Despite the fact that she thinks the new king isn't very bright she is fanatically loyal and faithful to him and is even willing to die for her king. Unlike his uncle, Julien treats her with a lot more respect (for example at the end of episode one he points out that he noticed she was the only one of the guards who didn't run away and because of that his promoting her to commander). Her shocked response to the comment implies that uncle Julien never bothered to even compliment her. A running gag is that she acts like she is talking with someone through a radio earpiece. She didn't believe in having a fun life until she slid down the water slide going after Mort during Uncle King Julien XII's return. In "Eat Prey Shove", it is revealed she writes a rather fan fiction-y romantic novel as a hobby. It is also here she meets Sage Moondancer, with whom Clover has a rather complex romantic relationship - while she loves him, his stoic and peaceful nature often irritates her. It takes several seasons for both of them to realize they balance each other out as the perfect weapon. In "Crimson and Clover," it is revealed that Clover has a twin sister named Crimson, with whom she has a long lasting rivalry. Despite their antagonistic behavior, they still consider each other family and Crimson has helped Clover out on occasion. In the storyline of "Exiled", Clover went on a quest with Sage to find the perfect weapon, only to realize through the teachings of Sage's annoying mudskipper master that they need each other to be in perfect balance (after spending a day body-swapped). Koto, Sage's evil brother wanted to force Clover to marry him, and she was ready to make this sacrifice for the life of Julien, but in the end she was freed and was essential in defeating Koto and his army. In Season 5, when King Julien puts security cameras all over the kingdom, Clover is overjoyed to finally be able to enforce all the long-forgotten ancient laws she never had the chance to. This overzealousness causes everyone in the kingdom to be arrested eventually, with Clover turning herself in too when she got up from the bed on the wrong foot. In episode 12, she expects Sage to propose to her, but finds out he is marrying her sister, Crimson. Trying to suppress her anger, she stays to help the mountain lemur kingdom, and eventually causes Sage to realize she is his soulmate, hurrying after her and proposing to her. This causes some concern for King Julien, as Clover will leave the kingdom after the marriage, so he tries to train the kingdom into an army, leading to disaster when real foosas attack. In the last episode, the wedding eventually proceeds after some hiccups, such as Julien burying Sage and forgetting where he was, and creating a Frankenstein's monster version to stand in for the wedding, while Clover reconciles with Crimson and says her goodbye to Julien. She leaves for the mountain lemur kingdom with Sage at the end of the episode after the wedding, explaining her absence in the Madagascar movies. A running gag is Clover always claiming to have a British accent, but everyone turning down her claims.
 Masikura (voiced by Debra Wilson) is a psychic chameleon who appears once you call her. She sticks her tongue on your head and analyzes you for predictions or reading thoughts. She told Julien's uncle that the king of the lemurs would be eaten by the Foosa. With that, Julien hands over the crown to his nephew and leaves. At the coronation, the Foosa interrupted and take some lemurs with them. Masikura told King Julien, Maurice, and Clover about what happened. King Julien goes to the Foosa territory to save the lemurs, he got bitten on the butt, he shouts and the boulders fall down, scaring the Foosa. Julien was relieved that Masikura was wrong about the Foosa eating him. Masikura appears and say she didn't say the Foosa wouldn't eat all of him completely and points at his butt. In "Poll Position", King Julien calls Masikura to use her tongue on Xixi's head to find out who's the one hater. Masikura denined, but King Julien grabbed her and starts shooting her tongue at Xixi. Her tongue hits Maurice's head and predicted grape jelly, a funnel, and a pair of woman shoes. Maurice said it was spring break. In "He Blinded Me with Science," Masikura played a big role, where she helps King Julien dance for the sky god Kevin to make it rain. When King Julien meets Timo, a tenrec scientist, he automates everything in the kingdom and they got hooked up on science. Later, King Julien let Masikura go, much to her dismay. She meets Mort in his tree stump and insisted to stay with him. During her stay, Masikura gets creeped out with Mort, saying he "sleep hugs" and says that he is a girl. Then, a fire breaks out from the generator, King Julien apologizes to Masikura and he, Maurice, and Clover ask for her help. Masikura believes that if they combined science and the rain that would put out the fire and save the kingdom. Timo makes a makeshift hose and King Julien danced on it to get the water out, thus putting the fire out.
 Maggie (voiced by Andy Richter) is a poor replacement of Masikura. Her predictions are shams and she constantly suffers from extreme flatulence. Maggie seems not to care about other people's opinion or about anything in general. She is often hired by various villains to be their accessory. Physically, she is identical to Masikura but has a much more pale color and is constantly cross-eyed.
 Prince Barty (voiced by John Michael Higgins) is a ring-tailed lemur who is the father of King Julien XIII and the husband of Princess Julienne. He always acts in a posh and upper-class manner. Like his wife, he does not care much about his son, or the fate of the kingdom, and they are content to live on a remote island as long as the kingdom sends them their regular mango supply. Whenever they visit King Julien, they always live in extreme luxury, serviced by a horde of servants. Often they have "parties" for their relatives (in actuality the relatives are killed by sharks).
 Princess Julienne (voiced by Anjelica Huston) is a ring-tailed lemur who is the mother King Julien XIII and the wife of Prince Barty. She is also the sister of Uncle King Julien. Like her husband, she does not care about her son at all, only that her constant supply of mango is provided on time, so she only shows up whenever there is any emergency in the kingdom that would threaten their income used to support their extravagant lifestyle. King Julien desperately wants their parents approval and love at first, even going as far as to hire Karl to kidnap them - however this turns into a real life-or-death situation due to Karl's betrayal. After his parents actually start to care about him, Julien gets annoyed by their constant doting and eventually gets them to leave.
 King Julien XII (voiced by Henry Winkler) is a ring-tailed lemur who is the maternal uncle of King Julien XIII. As Julien XIII's predecessor, Julien XII is a lazy, strict, paunchy, cowardly, and older lemur. In the first episode, he gives the crown to his nephew and leaves when he learns from Masikura that the king of the lemurs will be eaten by the Foosa. When King Julien saves the captured lemurs, he got bitten on the butt and is still alive. When King Julien XIII thrives as king, his devious uncle will do any conniving thing to regain the throne. Uncle King Julien returned in the fifth episode, not happy that his nephew is still alive and set to reclaim the throne from him. When King Julien was sliding down the water slide, his uncle turns off the water, leaving his rear end on fire. King Julien then sees his uncle and has a hard time remembering him, much to his annoyance. Maurice helped Julien remember by placing his crown on his uncle's head. He made up a story and tricked his nephew that he heard the Fossa were planning an attack and Julien volunteers to go to their territory and find out with Maurice in a Fossa disguise. During his absence, Uncle King Julien made changes to his throne room. Mort goes up to the throne room and sees Julien's uncle. Uncle Julien takes a seriously hatred of Mort. Mort says that Julien, (the other Julien), is the one and only king and is "a billion times better than him", which makes him mad. Uncle Julien orders Clover to destroy Mort, but Mort says he'd rather be destroyed by "his King Julien" and runs off crying. After seeing the changes his nephew made, he orders Clover to close down everything Julien put up. When Clover closed everything down, she chased Mort down the water slide when he was violating the rule against it and she actually enjoyed it. Clover tells Julien's uncle what happened and says the kingdom is happy for the first time in a long time and vows to help improve when Julien comes back. When Julien's uncle says that Julien is not coming back, Clover, discovering Julien's uncle's plot, angrily forces Uncle Julien to say it again and drags him to the Foosa territory. They see Julien and Maurice in the Fossa suit surrounded by the Fossa. Uncle Julien is unhappy that Clover wants his nephew as king. Before Uncle Julien can hit Clover, she hits Uncle Julien and uses him as bait to attract the Foosa and saves Julien and Maurice, while fighting the Fossa via suit. Julien knows his uncle's plot to reclaim the throne and is glad that Clover chose him, even though she didn't think the kingdom should be fun 24/7 but knows living in fear is worst. While taunting the Fossa with Uncle King Julien still as bait, Maurice wondered about what will they do with him, as he is not to be trusted. Julien says that his uncle is still family and "family always deserves a second chance." He suggests that they should give his uncle "a chance at a new life." The episode ends with Uncle Julien in the Foosa suit that is being cuddled by a Fossa girl much to his dismay. In a later episode he creates his own kingdom, Feartopia, tricks his nephew into giving him all his subjects, and imprisons them there as "citizens"; he is later imprisoned alone inside his own little dystopia. In season 5, he decided to give up his throne for Zora and flee with her for his joyfulness in which his nephew gave his excuses. According to Masikura in "Viva Mort," Julien's uncle is the worst king because he did some things to other kingdoms and never apologized. Masikura told King Julien he doesn't have to be his uncle, when she is trying to help him apologize to Maurice. In a later plot, Uncle King Julien lures the whole kingdom to another island by faking the end of the world, only to imprison them in a camp and locking his nephew in the "Iron Booty". In the end, Julien frees everyone, and instead locks his uncle inside the camp. Uncle King Julien returns to participate in the Jungle Olympics, enlisting Crimson and Sage on his team, trying to win the games - and the crown. In "Exiled", he is revealed to be running gladiatorial games and training foosa with Mary Ann. King Julien and Maurice go undercover in their bad foosa disguise, but Uncle King Julien easily sees through it, and tries to kill them. He joins their effort to save the kingdom when he learns it has been taken over by Koto, though. In the Season 5 episode "Night Creatures", he visits alongside his sister, King Julien's mother, to investigate the strange beast hauntings in the kingdom, hoping that he can get the crown back if King Julien is declared incompetent to rule. It is revealed though that he himself engineered the beast attacks by feeding gecko milk to King Julien, which causes an allergic transformation in the Julien bloodline. Captured in a cage, he is fed milk and forced to transform himself.  He returns in a later episode, where he engineers a plot to cause King Julien to depopulate the kingdom due to the increased arrests thanks to the security cameras he supplied Julien with. However, while watching the events unfold on the cameras, he is smitten by Zora, and starts sending love letters to her. Eventually Maurice locates him in a cave, and King Julien confronts him after he stole the crown, but he admits he no longer wants it, only to live happily with Zora. After Julien introduces him to her, the two are instantly smitten, and they leave, Uncle King Julien promising not to try and kill his nephew anymore. The two show up again in the last episode, attending Clover and Sage's wedding.
 Ted (voiced by Conrad Vernon in Madagascar, Andy Richter in All Hail King Julien) is a Golden bamboo lemur with a slight accent. Throughout all the series, Ted is shown to be nervous at many times. He says silly things like "Flipper-doodles" or "Maraschino cherries." Ted also has a tendency to joy- or fear-tinkle a lot, something he feels the need to exclaim loudly. He has a wife named Dorothy. Their marriage is revealed in the episode "Diapers are the New Black". Dorothy is more interested in the marriage than Ted, considering that he cried at their honeymoon. In the episode "That Sinking Feeling", when everyone thought the island was sinking, Dorothy tackled Hector just because he threw Ted way behind him. Ted makes appearances in most episodes, and played large roles in "Eat Prey Shove," and, "Diapers are the New Black." He was named as Clover's assistant captain of the Ringtail guard, but due to his cowardly nature (and because Clover is always around) he rarely if ever gets to do anything in this position. In "Poll Position" when people disliked King Julien, Ted would eat the kumquats off the pole, decreasing the popularity of people liking King Julien. He states it was his dream job and it has become a nightmare, when he ate too many kumquats because more people no longer like him. Maurice asks Julien why he has to eat the kumquats, and Julien answered it's the "only thing that brings him joy." In "Eat Prey Shove," Ted once covered for Clover when she was sent on a vacation with Mort and Xixi and unknowingly caused the Fossa to take advantage of Clover's vacation to attack King Julien's kingdom. In Exiled, Ted stows away on the submarine with King Julien, Maurice and Pancho when they escape the kingdom after Koto's takeover. On the island inhabited by sultry lady lemurs, Ted is the only one who does not succumb to their seduction, and consequently, eludes capture. The stress of being alone and hunted causes a split personality to take over Ted, who rescues Maurice and King Julien from the Tentacle. Calling himself Snake, this version of him wears an eyepatch, vest, and has a handlebar moustache. Snake is an extremely competent and fearless fighter, who acts like a 1990s action movie star and often says his name out loud for no reason. In Season 5, being bored with Ted's indecisive nature, Dorothy convinces Ted to bring Snake out once again with Dr S' experimental methods. However, she soon finds Snake to be boring due to his one-track mind and lack of curiosity. While shutting down Timo's water pump, Snake is shocked back to Ted, and Dorothy apologizes to him, saying he is the lemur she married and loves, not Snake. Later, when cameras being placed everywhere in the kingdom lead to an increased number of arrests, Clover deputizes Ted to be the prison's warden, a job he performs with great delight. In the end, only he ends up being the only not imprisoned lemur in the kingdom after Clover arrests herself. A frequent gag is Ted often saying wrong things at various different speeches in many different places because his agent, whom he argues with, is a banana.
 Karen (voiced by Ellie Kemper) is a blue-eyed white lemur who used to be King Julien's girlfriend.
 Willie (voiced by Cody Cameron in Madagascar, Jeff Bennett in All Hail King Julien) is a lemur who first appears in the first episode as one of the captured lemurs. King Julien saves them from the Foosa. Willie has a tendency to see the worst in everything, and his catchphrase is screaming "We are all gonna die!" whenever there is any crisis at hand. Consequently, King Julien tends to blame Willie for things he is not even responsible for. He goes so far as to often mention him by name whenever he has to make a public appearance to note whatever is troubling the country at the moment, adding "...and also, Willie" and eliciting an enraged "What the heck, man?" from him. Willie was briefly seen in the first film when he was called out during King Julien's meeting about what to do with Alex, Marty, Melman, and Gloria. He states that he likes them. It is noticeable that he has a different voice and design compared to his appearance in "All Hail King Julien."
Xixi (voiced by Betsy Sodaro) is a very trustworthy toucan in news who informs the lemur kingdom on current events. According to King Julien, Xixi also a very trustworthy Toucan in friendship. She covered King Julien's coronation party but fled when the party was raided by the Foosa in the first episode. She appears again in "Poll Position" in which she reports that 99% of the kingdom thinks the new king (Julien) is doing a good job. This report sets both episode plots in motion namely King Julien attempting to locate and turn the hater while also allowing Clover to launch an investigation to find the hater and make sure he isn't trying to recruit more lemurs to his side to cause an uprising. She makes another appearance in "Eat Pray Shove", when she happily accepts to go on a vacation with Clover and Mort. Xixi and Mort enjoy relaxing on the beach, while Clover doesn't. Xixi and Mort have a fun time while Clover went off and meet a handsome and muscular lemur.
 Hector (voiced by Jeff Bennett) is an incredibly moody black-and-white ruffed lemur. According to Maurice, Hector hates everybody and everything. He is also a bit odd. For example, when Clover asked if he didn't want to see King Julien to help him solve his problems, he replies to her that he likes his problems. According to Xixi, he has a very large family. Despite his bitterness, he does admit that King Julien is doing a better job than the previous kings. Hector also adds that he thinks that it is not a great accomplishment as he thinks the previous kings were much more incompetent than Julien was. In the episode "Poll Position", Hector was basically the only one who did not love Julien. After Julien knocked down Hector's masterpiece, his support went down by unhappiness of Hector's big family. In another appearance, Hector joined Abner and Becca in using catapults to "relocate" everyone from the kingdom whom they did not like, this soon caused the kingdom to lose most of its populace. In Season 5, he is revealed to be the Minister in charge of Mangoes, a post he fulfilled for a long time successfully protecting his charge from the fruit flies by a flyswatter he is really attached to. In the election battles between Maurice and Mort he is forced to abandon his post, leading to a crisis with the flies abducting everyone, but at the end he is restored to it again. Despite his grumpiness, Hector has a strong sense of logic and is often the only character to see how ridiculous a situation is. His catchphrase is declaring "Bunch of ding-dongs" whenever people do something stupid.
 Helen is a lemur and the mother of Hector who was abducted by humans.
 Horst (voiced by Jeff Bennett) is a blue-eyed black lemur. As said by Clover in the episode "My Fair Foosa", not much is known about him. Kind of a loner, fears change, and is always seen holding a beverage in a coconut shell. It was also revealed in the same episode that he was married to the fossa named Mary Ann but she mauled him twice because of his snoring. It is revealed in 'King Julien Superstar' that he is also known as DJ Glitter-Bunz. He usually interrupts whatever he is saying by taking a long sip from his beverage through a straw before finishing the sentence, annoying others. In Exiled, he and Mary Ann reconcile and get back together once again. In Season 5, he is shown to be having a picnic with Mary Ann, still loving her despite her hard to suppress urges to eat him. When the other foosa rebel and tie the two to a tree, Horst reveals that due to the many scarring he received while romancing Mary Ann, he can contort and mangle his body to escape his bonds, impressing Mary Ann, who declares her love for him before leaving to restore order amongst the foosa.
 Dorothy (voiced by Sarah Thyre) is a mongoose lemur who is the wife of Ted. She appears to be at about the same intelligence level of her husband. Dorothy is sweet, caring, and possibly good at cooking. She is a minor character throughout all the series. In the episode "Diapers are the New Black", Dorothy and Ted start creating fraud diapers to make a profit. This leads to Julien getting upset that another brand is stealing customers, so he and Ted get in a competition of diaper-making. Dorothy and Ted's relationship starts getting better and better in the fourth series. Their marriage is revealed in the third series. In Season 5, Dorothy is bored with Ted's indecisive nature and ask Dr S' help to bring out Ted's more manly alter-ego, Snake. However, Snake is revealed to be rather simple-minded and crude, and at the end Dorothy is happy to get her husband back.
 Pancho (voiced by Danny Jacobs) is a crowned lemur. He is mentioned in "Poll Position" when Xixi mentions him in her report stating that he is looking cozy for he's canoodling with a new lemur lady and questions if love is in the air. King Julien agrees that he hopes so and states that "Pancho needs it." In Season 4, it is revealed in 'The Panchurian Candidate' that Uncle King Julien uses mind-washing to condition Pancho as the perfect assassin, for the scenario if he is ever deposed. Unaware of this, Pancho is activated when he hears the trigger word, to kill King Julien. Thanks to Clover and Maurice, the assassination is averted, but Pancho remains ill at ease and paranoid after this experience. In Exiled, when King Julien and Maurice have to flee the kingdom, they escape in a nuclear submarine piloted by Pancho, who was preparing for this scenario due to his paranoia. Later, he sabotages the blimp of the Russian chimps at King Julien's orders, and is thrown out of the blimp as a result. He is revealed to have survived though. Pancho is known as a felon (which according to him is written with a "ph") to other lemurs, who keep their distance from him. In Season 5, Pancho's skills with explosives are often used when destruction is needed, though he often tends to go overboard with violent solutions to problems.
 Sage Moondancer (voiced by Jeff Bennett) is a buff and spiritualistic indri lemur. He tends to speak in spiritualist, hippie-like sentences nobody seems to understand. Despite his great strength and fighting skills, he is a devoted pacifist. He and Clover have a complicated romantic relationship - he is drawn to her but often feels threatened by her aggressiveness. Sage has made lifelong a bond with a great eagle, who comes to his aid or to carry him off when it's needed; he can call him via squawking at any time. It is revealed in "Exiled" that Sage is from the warlike kingdom of the Mountain Lemurs - he left because he disagrees with their conquering, oppressing ways and chose spiritual peace. Unfortunately, in his absence, his evil brother Koto took over the kingdom and conquered King Julien's lemurs and all neighboring kingdoms. Sage goes on a quest with Clover to get help, asking for assistance from his mentor, an enigmatic but seemingly crazy mudskipper named Jarsh-Jarsh. In the end, Sage and Clover bond as they realize after a body-swapped experience that they are the perfect weapon, able to balance each other out. Sage defeats Koto in combat, but at Clover's request spares his life (though he is squashed under his own statue anyway when he tries to backstab Sage). In Season 5, Sage has to leave King Julien's kingdom to lead his people as their new king, relocating them back to their ancient kingdom. In episode 12, he engages to Crimson, but ends up realizing that Clover is the life-long mate he was always searching for. In episode 13, Sage asks King Julien to bury him during his bachelor party so he can meditate. As the king forgets to mark the spot, they cannot locate Sage the next day, leading to a fake Sage being made by Dr. S., but the real Sage arrives at the wedding eventually and marries Clover.
 Tammy (voiced by Debra Wilson) is a common brown lemur who is the mother of Todd and the wife of Butterfish. While she loves her son, she tends to pressure him. She is domineering and in every competition tries to push Todd into the foreground, even cheating if it is necessary. Unlike most lemurs, she does not respect King Julien at all.
 Butterfish (voiced by Kevin Michael Richardson) is a lemur who is the husband of Tammy and the father of Todd.
 Todd (voiced by Kevin Michael Richardson in All Hail King Julien, JP Karliak in Madagascar: A Little Wild) is a common brown lemur who is the son of Tammy and Butterfish. He is a child prodigy according to his mother, but being forced to perform in every competition seems to have taken a toll on him. Todd is often nervous and has a tic, and when he snaps he can be a terrifying force which can even frighten Mountain lemurs. He and Mort are often rivals because of their similar size, and because his mother often tries to make Todd replace Mort.
 Timo (voiced by Chris Miller in Madagascar, David Krumholtz in All Hail King Julien) is a tenrec scientist who is an expert on technology.  King Julien first encountered Timo in "He Blinded Me with Science" where he replaced the batteries in King Julien's boom box after it ran out of power during King Julien's dance to get the Sky God Kevin to bring rain to his kingdom. Upon introducing Timo to the lemurs, King Julien had them receive the technology that was salvaged from Timo's area. The lemurs get hooked on the technology until a power surge happened that destroyed Timo's generator and started a fire. With help from Masikura, King Julien, Maurice, Mort, Clover, and Timo were able to find ground water to help stop the fire. In "Viva Mort", Timo invented a device that would help King Julien to make him embarrassed as a way to make it up to Maurice. Due to the device not being plugged in, Maurice was put through the device and embarrassed instead. In "The Really Really Big Lie," King Julien asks Timo to build a giant mechanical gecko to make it believable to cover his lie. The robot gecko went on a rampage, leaving the kingdom in a panic. Timo says that the off switch is on the bunny ears because Todd loves bunnies. King Julien, Maurice, and Clover managed to shut down the mechanical gecko and escaped from a fall. In "One More Cup," King Julien, Maurice, and Mort find a bag of coffee beans and take it to Timo, who made a coffee machine. King Julien drinks the coffee and feels the energy. King Julien and Timo sells the coffee to the lemurs that Julien calls "Brown Julien". In King Julien Superstar, Timo helped King Julien and the gang become famous superstars by "tuning" their voices to sound good. In Exiled, Timo is absent during the takeover of the country by Koto's army, because he is trapped in his home by the domineering Mom-Bot he has built. Extremely possessive of her "son", Mom-Bot constantly berates Timo and wants to control all aspects of his life - it is only with Mort's help that he is able to shut her down and reprogram her. Afterwards, Timo helps Mort bring out Smart Mort, and builds a gate to Morticus Khan's dimension as per his plans. In Season 5, Timo builds pipes to dump all the sewage into the watering hole as per King Julien's orders - which he then blames him for, leading Clover to arrest him. Later, he builds a pump to funnel the sewage underground, with disastrous results.
 Mom-Bot (voiced by David Krumholtz) is a domineering mother figure robot built by Timo who somewhat resembles an owl, and speaks with a Jewish accent and always offers to bake traditional Jewish cookies to people. She is also armed to the teeth with lasers, rockets and built-in weaponry. Timo built him to be a supporting mother figure to himself, but her programming was glitchy and she basically imprisoned Timo, doting on him constantly, belittling his achievements, and berating him for not having a girlfriend or having a good job. When Mort visits, he is also captured and forced to stay, but they eventually manage to disable Mom-Bot and Timo reprograms her to be less manic - though she still tends to be doting. She helps the two build the portal to Morticus Khan's dimension, where the Khan attacks and dismembers Mom-Bot, reducing her to a head. In Season 5, Mom-Bot is still just a head, though Timo carries her around when she has to go somewhere.
 King Joey (voiced by Bill Fagerbakke) is a jumping rat who is the ruler of Madagascar's jumping rats. Like his kind, King Joey is not very bright.
 Clumsy Pete appeared once, in the episode "The Jungle Games". During spear throwing, he failed miserably, causing Xixi to state that King Joey should have put in Efficient Charlie. During harpoon shooting, Clover and Crimson get in a fight, causing them to get eliminated and give the round to Clumsy Pete and the rats by default. But while Clumsy Pete mumbled about which button it is to shoot, he hit his own leg. He was out for the Jungle Games and was never seen or mentioned again.
 Efficient Charlie, unlike the rest of is kingdom, was surprisingly bright. He was said to always get jobs done. In the episode "True Bromance", when Maurice left the lemur kingdom because he was mad at King Julien, he says that he wished Julien would disappear. Since King Joey was not bright, he thought that Maurice wanted Julien killed. Joey put Lazy Dougie on the job, but Efficient Charlie was put in after Dougie overslept. Charlie was seen preparing to throw Julien off a cliff when Maurice arrived and rescued him. Efficient Charlie was not seen again, but he was mentioned in the episode 'The Jungle Games' when Xixi said that Charlie should have been in during spear throwing instead of Clumsy Pete.
 Lazy Dougie was a member of the jumping rat kingdom. He was shown to be very lazy. He only appears once in the episode "True Bromance". He was supposed to have murdered King Julien, but he instead put Efficient Charlie on the job due to him oversleeping. Dougie was not seen or mentioned ever again.
 Becca (voiced by Sarah Thyre in a Southern accent) is a red/orange-eyed black lemur who is Abner's wife. Becca and Abner encountered King Julien in his alias of "Banana Guy Mike" where he had helped them fix their watering hole. She and her husband vowed to get King Julien off his throne to avenge the "death" of Banana Guy Mike. They remain strong opposers of King Julien and consider themselves a resistance movement, albeit they are very inept and know not much about the democracy they fight for. In "Viva Mort," Becca and Abner have started the Lemur Alliance Liberation Army (LALA) to get revenge on King Julien. They duped Mort into helping them until their movement was discovered by Clover. Though Becca and Abner are thwarted, Clover had to leave to keep King Julien from getting stung by a scorpion that was placed in a package that they had Mort give to him.
In a later episode, they and Hector decide to rid the kingdom of all "unwanted elements", via catapulting them outside the walls they built. This eventually leads to only them staying in the kingdom.
 Abner (voiced by Jeffrey Katzenberg in Madagascar, Diedrich Bader in a Southern accent in All Hail King Julien) is a blue-eyed lemur who is Becca's husband and is not very bright. Abner and Becca encountered King Julien in his alias of "Banana Guy Mike" where he had helped them with their powers. He and his wife vowed to get King Julien off his throne to avenge the "death" of Banana Guy Mike. In Madagascar, he is only seen in the paradise scene, serving drinks and later watching Alex do his performance. In "Viva Mort," Abner and Becca have started the Lemur Alliance Liberation Army to get revenge on King Julien. They duped Mort into helping them until their movement was discovered by Clover. Though Abner and Becca are thwarted, Clover had to leave to keep King Julien from getting stung by a scorpion that was placed in a package that they had Mort give to him.
 Karl (voiced by Dwight Schultz) is a devious fanaloka. He is a card-carrying villain (literally) who took it upon himself to become the arch-nemesis of King Julien. Known for his theatrics and love of over-complicated plans, Karl is the kind of villain who rather "arches" his nemesis than to actually kill him. It is revealed eventually that he blames Julien for the way he treated him in high school. He is always encountered with his pet hissing cockroach, Chauncey, who is actually his one true friend and companion as well. He tends to make dramatic getaways when thwarted, announcing "This is not over - not yet, at least." After he did some attempts on King Julien's life where Mort took a blow to every attempt, Karl makes himself known to King Julien and invites him to his lair with the directs on the brochure. After Clover and Maurice are captured, King Julien makes his way to Karl's lair at a crashed zeppelin where Karl mentions his plans to raise the zeppelin and take over the world with King Julien as his partner. While Karl was ranting about his plans, King Julien manages to free Clover and Maurice. When King Julien, Clover, and Maurice exit the zeppelin, they are confronted by Karl who prepares to fire a laser at him until the balloon carrying the rocks with every wishes that the lemurs wrote on them for the Sky God member Frank falls from the sky and lands on Karl. Seeing his "Surprise Me" wish roll against him, King Julien took it as a sign that Frank had helped him defeat Karl. In "One More Cup," it is revealed that Karl survived and returned where he hooked the whole kingdom on caffeine which was part of his plan. He states he watches King Julien fooling around in the Cove of Wonders instead of following his kingly duties. Karl threw a bag of coffee beans in the ocean and knew that Julien would find it because it has the word "king" on it. The hyper kingdom threw out King Julien, Maurice, and Clover. With the help of Mort (who became intelligent from the coffee), they plan to destroy Karl's coffee supply. They approach to Karl's zeppelin while Smart Mort walks through the fields where he meets jumping rats working there. Karl returns, finding them, and tries to destroy them when the jumping rats break through the door demanding a raise from their boss, even the ones cornering Julien, Maurice, and Clover. Later, Karl surrounds the group and prepares to fire his incinerator at Julien until Smart Mort bites him on the foot. King Julien has the weapon and sees that Karl has Mort in his clutches and says that he has one shot, him or Mort. Julien, having no choice, aims the incinerator at the fields destroying the crops leaving Karl devastated worrying what will Bruce will say when he returns from his vacation. King Julien now aims the laser at Karl who states that it charges. Karl escapes in a hot balloon with Chauncey driving it. Karl vows that he will return and will never stop getting rid of King Julien.  In "Are You There Frank? It's Me, Julien," Karl creates a special armor that allows him to pose as Frank the Sky God in order to get the Lemurs to oppose Frank's brother Larry the Volcano God by sacrificing King Julien. With help from Mort operating the Larry armor that Timo built, King Julien repels Karl. in "Revenge of the Prom", Karl reveals that he was in all of Julien's old high school classes, but Julien never noticed him. In Exiled, Karl unexpectedly saves King Julien and offers to help him take back his kingdom - if only to destroy him later himself. However, King Julien accidentally destroys Karl's super-weapon, the Karl-Star, and they are both captured by Koto. In Season 5, it is revealed Karl's older and domineering brother Bruce has a successful coffee business, and he wants to partner with King Julien - but he ends up buying out Julien and spreading his coffee shops everywhere. Clover and Maurice ally with Karl, who hates his brother for bullying him, and together they ruin his company. At the end it is revealed this was Karl's plan all along, he knew King Julien would cause Bruce's downfall. In "Karlmaggedon", Karl decides to retire and announces to leave his role as King Julien's arch-nemesis to whoever wins the contest - with Fairfax and Pancho, Tammy and Butterfish, Mort and his Grandpa, and King Julien and Clover contesting for the role (the latter figuring he can be his own nemesis). This all turns out to be a ruse, to keep Julien busy while Karl prepares his ultimate weapon, the Karl-Star to destroy Madagascar with lasers. However, at King Julien's signal, the lemurs use mirrors to make the Karl-Star blow itself up. Julien reveals he expected this from Karl as he always kept bragging about his penchant for using lasers. Defeated, Karl makes good on his promise to retire and travels to Florida with Chauncey on a hot air balloon, admitting that there are no "not yet, at leasts" this time.
 Chauncey (vocal effects provided by Kevin Michael Richardson) is a Madagascar hissing cockroach who is Karl's pet and henchman. Chauncey spies on King Julien and reports anything he hears to Karl. In the episode "The Jungle Rooster", King Julien managed to convince Chauncey to join his side. Eventually, Karl tells Chauncey he would never choose Mary Ann over him and they become best friends again.
 Crimson (voiced by India de Beaufort) is a red-furred blue-eyed crowned lemur who is the twin sister of Clover and is the opposite of her. Crimson leaves a trail of destruction everywhere she goes and she wants to marry and then murder King Julien, then move on to another lemur to do the same thing. She even seduces Sage at one point, though only briefly. Later, she allies with Uncle King Julien, aiding him in trying to win his throne back in return for later favors. While competing against Clover in the olympic games, she shows that she still has feelings for her sister when she helps her win. In Exiled, she seems to have abandoned her old boss and moved to an island inhabited with female lemurs, capturing travelers to sacrifice them to a tentacle beast.
In Season 5 episode 12, Clover is expecting Sage to propose to her, and is shocked to find that Sage is inviting her to his wedding - to Crimson! Clover tries her best to still be supportive to her friend, and eventually Sage comes to the realization he wants to spend with life with Clover, not Crimson. In episode 13, Crimson shows up during the wedding preparations at the insistence of her ghostly grandmother Rose. She admits to Clover that she was always jealous of her being more successful, and hence tried to prove herself by taking away the things Clover gained - like Sage. Clovers forgives her and the sisters reconcile, with Crimson leading Clover to the altar at the wedding. At the end it is shown she still has not given up on wooing King Julien, though he is not falling for her tricks anymore.
 Rob McTodd (voiced by David Koechner) is a Coquerel's sifaka who was King Julien's old friend. Maurice never liked Rob as he was a bad influence on Julien, and eventually Uncle King Julien had him banished. Rob returns years later to reconcile, but secretly plans revenge - revealing that he has aged and lost his good looks, he plans to transplant Julien's face to his own. Julien still likes Rob and reconciles with him, and while he has taken up odd habits, such as hibernating in a cave, he seems to have adjusted fine to the changes. Rob now calls himself Nurse Phantom and serves as the assistant to Dr S. - his now deformed face and mannerisms a homage to the Phantom of the Opera. During Exiled, he works with Mort to organize the resistance against Koto. In Season 5, Robb is seemingly restored to his original appearance, only to suddenly be crushed to death in a series of unlikely accidents after warning King Julien that something weird is going on. However, it is revealed later that like everyone else, he was replaced with a robot duplicate by Karl. In the last episode, he plays Igor to Dr S. when they create a fake Sage for the wedding.
 Vigman Wildebeest (voiced by Jeff Bennett) is a cocky blue wildebeest, he was a rival of Clover's grandmother. In the episode 'Eye of Clover", he enters the tournament and defeats every player. However he is defeated by Clover when he falls into the Pit of Doom. He is often seen in scenes taking place in Heaven, where he has a rematch against Clover's grandmother Rose.
 Dr. S (voiced by Jeff Bennett) is a cobra who works as a self-taught underworld doctor. Though it takes work to get a doctor's license, Dr. S' claim is that he can't get busted if he practices medicine in his own cave. He was brought to the kingdom by Rob who wanted to use him in his revenge plot, but after reconciling with Julien, the king let them stay. Dr S, while quite the mad scientist, has helped King Julien out in a lot of strange cases with his questionable "science" - even bringing the dead to life at one time. He also likes to experiment on willing (and unwilling) subjects, though without much maliciousness. His catchphrase is shouting "Operating out of a CAAAVEEE!" which is always accompanied by lightning and thunder.
 Fred (voiced by H. Jon Benjamin) is a giant scorpion that lives in the desert parts of Madagascar. He apparently had a "personal problem" of eating babies, but has reformed. When Clover makes up a story that unfortunately features Fred as the villain (not knowing that he actually exists), it riles him up enough to attack the kingdom. In Exiled, Fred is revealed to have become a guru for a self-help cult. As Clover and Sage are caught up in the cult's brainwashing, they are approached by Fred, who wants out—it is revealed that he just wanted a quick scam but people believed his fake teachings so much, he could not leave. In the end Clover successfully breaks her indoctrination and makes the cult disband, but Pam and Fred quickly start another quick money-making scheme again. In Season 5, Fred shows up for the wedding of Sage and Clover, though he has no dialogue.
 Pam Simonsworthington (voiced by Grey DeLisle) is a ridiculously fast female ring-tailed mongoose who wears goggles. She first appeared in the episode "The King and Mrs. Mort". Since King Julien was being hospitalized, Mort was temporarily the king. Pam arrived at the kingdom and told Mort, who pretended to be Julien, that she was a judge for a contest of which kingdom was the best. Mort showed her around the kingdom nervously. Near the end of the episode, Maurice and Clover do some investigating and find out the truth about Pam. She was a manipulator who ran from kingdom to kingdom marrying kings, robbing the kingdom, and running off. Clover attacks Pam, but she uses her speed to beat Clover up. At the very end, Maurice and Clover round up some kings of other kingdoms, and Clover screams out some of Pam's nicknames like Stephanie Jeeves or Lilly Teeterwagon. The crocodile ambassador complains to Pam, to which she states that he couldn't even give her a proper massage. King Joey just looks confused as usual, and Pam says that he was the easiest one. The shark king complains in shark language. Knowing that she has been caught, Pam uses her super speed to run away. But she is caught in a net trap that Clover made and temporarily captured. The next time she is seen is in the episode "Cult Fiction", and she has changed quite a bit. She has apparently given up her job on manipulating kings and is now part of a fake cult that Fred the giant scorpion created. Clover and Sage, who are looking for a weapon that will save the kingdom from Koto and the mountain lemurs, watch a bit. Sage wants to leave, but Clover is sucked in because all of Fred's fake wise words make so much sense to her. Clover's enthusiasm lead to Pam putting her on a higher rank. One night, Fred tells Clover and Sage that everything is fake and he needs their help to escape. They agree, but Clover changes her mind and captures Fred and Sage. But she changes her mind again after a message from Jarsh-Jarsh in a dream and instead deprograms the cult-addicted minds of everyone. Pam however quickly suggests a get-rich scheme to Fred and they start another cult again. In Season 5, Pam shows up disguised as King Julien's popularity manager, Eloise. When King Julien starts "Facewall" (a parody of Facebook), and gets obsessed who gets more "Fleeks" (likes), Eloise steers him to change his views and entourage to be more liked by his people. This causes Julien to hire Todd to his "posse", and fire Clover and Maurice to replace them by a puppet operated by Pancho. However, as the puppet becomes more popular than him, soon the people choose to elect it instead of him, with a disguised Pam planning to marry the puppet and become queen. Clover and Maurice find out though that her "polls" were based on asking oblivious children or heavily manipulated. Clover knocks out Eloise, revealing her to be Pam - the first time Clover actually beat her in combat. Pam admits she did not even want the crown anyway, considering the people were stupid enough to elect a puppet. She is locked in jail, and immediately hits on the also imprisoned Pancho. Pam's personality is very cocky, and she has a loud laugh. Overall, she is not as evil as someone like Koto, but she is still not a very nice person due to her penchant for thievery and manipulation.
 Jarsh-Jarsh (voiced by JB Blanc) is a mudskipper and Sage's mentor. When first encountered by Clover, he seemed to be only able to say his name and spit mud at her and waddle on the ground. After testing Clover's (very tenuous) patience this way, he revealed a map that would lead them to the ultimate weapon. In the end it was revealed to have been another of Jarsh-Jarsh's tests itself. Jarsh-Jarsh then body-swapped Sage and Clover, which lead to Sage experiencing anger and rage, he beat up his mentor when Jarsh-Jarsh mocked him - until Clover, in Sage's body, intervened. Jarsh-Jarsh then revealed that this was the final test all along - so each of them understands the other and their anger and calmness balance themselves out. In Season 5, Jarsh-Jarsh shows up in the last episode, attending Sage and Clover's wedding - Sage had to pick him up as he does not travel by hawk, causing him to be late to his wedding.
 Koto (voiced by Maurice LaMarche) is a mountain lemur and Sage's brother. He is the antithesis of his sibling - cruel, domineering, aggressive and manipulative. First appearing at the end of Season 4, Koto is rescued from a snake by King Julien, who shows him around the kingdom - little suspecting that Koto was simply scouting ahead for a kingdom to take over. At the end of the season, Koto arrives with his mountain lemur army and conquers King Julien's kingdom as well as the neighbouring ones like the rats or the crocodiles. He takes Julien's crown and enslaves the people, forcing them to work on his statue. In Exiled, Koto has to deal with the underground rebellion started by Mort, who eventually escapes. Sage also gives one last try to reconcile with his brother by reminding them of their childhood bond, but Koto mocks his sentiments. When King Julien returns, having raised an army from the friends encountered during his voyage, they are initially successful, but Julien is forced to surrender to save his friends. Koto plans to force Clover into marriage, and execute King Julien at the wedding - however an attack led by Maurice and Mort saves them. Koto has a showdown with his brother Sage, who defeats him but spares his life at Clover's request. Koto tries to backstab King Julien anyway, which causes his statue to collapse on top of him, ending his reign of terror. In Season 5, Koto is shown in Frankri-La with the Pineapple and all the characters who died in the series.
 Zora is a female mountain lemur who arrived with Koto but fell in love with Mort during Exiled. She marries him in Season 5 but they later break up. Later, Uncle King Julien falls in love with her and she's smitten with him. He renounces his evil ways for her and they leave together. The two show up again in the last episode, attending Clover and Sage's wedding.
 Brosalind (voiced by Kether Donohue) is an aye-aye and Maurice's sister.
 Grandpa Mort (voiced by Frank Welker) is a wizened old mouse lemur. Though Mort only has vague memories of him, he indeed seems to be his grandfather, but was imprisoned decades ago due to conspiring against one of King Julien's ancestors. Grandpa Mort shows up in "Karlmaggedon" to offer one of the golden mangoes to Mort, so they can join the contest to become the new nemesis of King Julien. It is revealed at the end of the contest that he only wants to make Mort turn to evil, as is in his blood, and help him fulfill his destiny of destroying King Julien. When Mort refuses, Grandpa Mort reveals the Mort family line always absorbs the essence of the weaker ones, hence ensuring only the most evil remain, and attempts to do the same to Mort. While he succeeds, he then suddenly explodes, with Mort absorbing his essence instead.
 Captain Ethan (voiced by Rob Paulsen) is a rat who is the leader of the pirates that operate in the waters of Madagascar.
 Lil' Arms Magee (voiced by Rob Paulsen) was a crocodile that worked for Captain Ethan. Magee, along with One-Eyed Simon and No Name Jack, worked for Ethan's crew of pirates that operated the waters near Madagascar. Magee was first seen in the episode "O' Captain my Captain-Part 1". His crew was sparring while King Julien, who had just gotten captured, watched. At the end, Jimmy was thrown overboard due to his lack of fighting skills. Throughout the three episodes that Magee appeared in, he was shown to have tiny arms just like the rest of his kind, and that resulted in stress. For example, when Julien tried to escape, he told Magee that there was a contest to see who could give Ethan the best hug. Magee is sad because he realizes that he would never win. But Julien offers to coach him only because he thinks he can grab the key to the jail cell. Out of all the pirates, Magee was shown to always have the most support for Julien. When Julien became captain and asked pirates questions about what they did, Magee and the other pirates sang him a song. Later, when Mort and Clover invaded to rescue Julien, Magee attacked them along with his mates. Magee was shown to have been knocked out by Clover along with Simon and jack. But later, the pirates woke up and chased down Julien, Mort, and Clover. Ethan was knocked out though, and Julien charmed the rest of the pirates with mangoes and got them to sail away. In the episode 'The Love Gauntlet,', when Karl and Chauncey's plan to drown Julien and his parents in a volcano failed, Karl recruited the pirates to attack them. But Ethan missed Julien on a charge and drowned in the volcano, and Julien charmed the rest of the pirates with trophies to chase Karl and Chauncey away. Magee and his mates decided to give Julien's parents a ride back to their island later, and Magee was never seen nor mentioned ever again.
 Horton is not a well-known character. He is a lemur of the kingdom. Horton appeared once in the episode "Diapers are the New Black". He wears a diaper and he and the other lemurs make fun of diaper-less lemurs like Ted and Dorothy. Horton is laughing at them, but a few seconds later, his diaper has been stolen. Ted is accused, and a big fight breaks out. Horton's name is revealed when Clover tells King Julien and Maurice that someone stole his diaper. He is never seen or mentioned again.
 Jeffrey is a random lemur of the kingdom. He has no lines. He appeared in the episode "Fast Food Lemur Nation". Jeffrey is not a well-known character. His name is revealed when King Julien says hi to him while he, along with the whole kingdom, was being magnetized by a gigantic magnet. Jeffrey is the same color as most of the kingdom, which is light gray. His status is unknown because he is never seen or mentioned again after that.
 'Andy Fairfax (voiced by Diedrich Bader) is a bat who is involved in trickery, particularly to sell things. In the episode "Get Off My Lawn," he slyly sells all the lemurs in the kingdom protection scorpions, leaving Clover without a job. He is seen in many episodes selling things to unknowing people, like a comfort Mort in "Julien 2.0." He and Pancho are often seen together robbing houses, as seen in "The All Hail King Julien Show." Often he uses his charming personality to fool others. Apparently he and Pancho met at a summer camp for grown-ups that lasted for 3–5 years.
 Mary-Ann (voiced by Debra Wilson) is a female fossa and Horst's secret-lover.

Madagascar: A Little Wild

 Ant'ney (voiced by Eric Petersen) is a street-wise adult pigeon who is friends with the Zoosters. He delivers any big news to the Zoosters that he hears on the streets of New York City and sometimes helps them out on their adventures. His favorite activity is finding food laying on the ground and eating it.
 Pickles and Dave (voiced by Candace Kozak) are brother and sister chimpanzees who live in the trees in the same den as the Zoosters. Pickles is a very tomboyish monkey, while her brother, Dave, is deaf and can only communicate through standard monkey chattering. They have a secret lever in their tree that they use to open a secret tunnel allowing the Zoosters to go out into the city, but only after the Zoosters pay them a fee.
 Kate (voiced by Jasmine Gatewood) is the Zookeeper of the New York Zoo. It's her duty to take care of all the animals at the zoo as best she can. Alex, Marty, Melman and Gloria are her favorites with Melman being the one who loves her back the most.
 Murray (voiced by Charlie Adler is an Mille's husband who is the only human in New York City who notices the Zoosters whenever they're out on the town, but his wife, Millie, doesn't ever believe him.
 Mille (voiced by Johanna Stein) is Murray's wife who always missed out when the Zoosters are around town when Merray notices them.
 Carlos (voiced by Eric Lopez) is another employee in the zoo who often acts as Kate's second-in-command, but oftentimes, he doesn't know what he's doing.
 Ranger Hoof (voiced by Da'Vine Joy Randolph) is a military horse who often visits the New York Zoo. Marty idolizes her and dreams of being a horse ranger just like her.
 Lucia (voiced by Myrna Velasco) is a sloth who was introduced in Season 3 of the show. She's very excitable and loves to teach the Zoosters about things she learned in her homeland, but she also loves to learn new things as well.
 Lala (voiced by Grace Lu) is a tadpole who was introduced in Season 3. She is very optimistic about having new experiences and ends up becoming Gloria's best friend, but Gloria is a bit obsessed and overprotective with her.

Merry Madagascar
 Donner (voiced by Jim Cummings) is the leader of Santa Claus' reindeer. His name is revealed in the song "Santa Claus is Coming to Madagascar". His personality is snarky, rude, selfish, and usually gets in fights with Skipper, Private, Rico, and Kowalski.
 Cupid (voiced by Nina Dobrev) is one of Santa Claus' reindeer who falls in love with Private. She is kind-hearted, and is against Donner's nasty behavior.

Reception

Sean Axmaker of Seattle Post-Intelligencer praised the characters, noting the "marvelous character animation" and "the palpable camaraderie between animal buddies" kept Madagascar: Escape 2 Africa "rolling". Axmaker also commended the voice of Zuba, played by Bernie Mac, saying "his vocal makeover is so complete that you may not recognize his voice, but you will appreciate the warmth and vivid personality of his creation."

References

Animated characters
Lists of animated film characters
Animated characters by series
Lists of fictional animals in animation
Lists of fictional animals by work
Madagascar (franchise)